

570001–570100 

|-bgcolor=#E9E9E9
| 570001 ||  || — || January 26, 2006 || Kitt Peak || Spacewatch ||  || align=right | 2.0 km || 
|-id=002 bgcolor=#fefefe
| 570002 ||  || — || January 26, 2006 || Kitt Peak || Spacewatch ||  || align=right data-sort-value="0.67" | 670 m || 
|-id=003 bgcolor=#E9E9E9
| 570003 ||  || — || January 26, 2006 || Kitt Peak || Spacewatch ||  || align=right | 1.7 km || 
|-id=004 bgcolor=#E9E9E9
| 570004 ||  || — || January 26, 2006 || Kitt Peak || Spacewatch || AGN || align=right data-sort-value="0.94" | 940 m || 
|-id=005 bgcolor=#fefefe
| 570005 ||  || — || January 26, 2006 || Kitt Peak || Spacewatch ||  || align=right data-sort-value="0.67" | 670 m || 
|-id=006 bgcolor=#E9E9E9
| 570006 ||  || — || January 27, 2006 || Kitt Peak || Spacewatch || EUN || align=right | 1.0 km || 
|-id=007 bgcolor=#fefefe
| 570007 ||  || — || November 12, 2001 || Apache Point || SDSS Collaboration ||  || align=right data-sort-value="0.51" | 510 m || 
|-id=008 bgcolor=#d6d6d6
| 570008 ||  || — || January 25, 2006 || Kitt Peak || Spacewatch ||  || align=right | 2.5 km || 
|-id=009 bgcolor=#fefefe
| 570009 ||  || — || January 10, 2006 || Kitt Peak || Spacewatch ||  || align=right data-sort-value="0.62" | 620 m || 
|-id=010 bgcolor=#E9E9E9
| 570010 ||  || — || January 27, 2006 || Kitt Peak || Spacewatch ||  || align=right | 2.0 km || 
|-id=011 bgcolor=#E9E9E9
| 570011 ||  || — || January 27, 2006 || Kitt Peak || Spacewatch ||  || align=right | 1.6 km || 
|-id=012 bgcolor=#d6d6d6
| 570012 ||  || — || January 27, 2006 || Mount Lemmon || Mount Lemmon Survey ||  || align=right | 1.7 km || 
|-id=013 bgcolor=#E9E9E9
| 570013 ||  || — || January 30, 2006 || Kitt Peak || Spacewatch ||  || align=right | 1.2 km || 
|-id=014 bgcolor=#E9E9E9
| 570014 ||  || — || October 24, 2005 || Mauna Kea || Mauna Kea Obs. || AGN || align=right | 1.2 km || 
|-id=015 bgcolor=#E9E9E9
| 570015 ||  || — || November 7, 2005 || Mauna Kea || Mauna Kea Obs. ||  || align=right | 1.6 km || 
|-id=016 bgcolor=#E9E9E9
| 570016 ||  || — || July 9, 2003 || Kitt Peak || Spacewatch ||  || align=right | 1.5 km || 
|-id=017 bgcolor=#fefefe
| 570017 ||  || — || January 23, 2006 || Kitt Peak || Spacewatch ||  || align=right | 1.0 km || 
|-id=018 bgcolor=#C2FFFF
| 570018 ||  || — || January 31, 2006 || Kitt Peak || Spacewatch || L5 || align=right | 6.8 km || 
|-id=019 bgcolor=#E9E9E9
| 570019 ||  || — || January 31, 2006 || Kitt Peak || Spacewatch ||  || align=right | 1.8 km || 
|-id=020 bgcolor=#E9E9E9
| 570020 ||  || — || January 6, 2006 || Kitt Peak || Spacewatch ||  || align=right | 1.9 km || 
|-id=021 bgcolor=#E9E9E9
| 570021 ||  || — || April 2, 2016 || Haleakala || Pan-STARRS ||  || align=right | 1.7 km || 
|-id=022 bgcolor=#d6d6d6
| 570022 ||  || — || January 22, 2006 || Mount Lemmon || Mount Lemmon Survey ||  || align=right | 3.0 km || 
|-id=023 bgcolor=#E9E9E9
| 570023 ||  || — || January 31, 2006 || Mount Lemmon || Mount Lemmon Survey ||  || align=right | 2.1 km || 
|-id=024 bgcolor=#C2FFFF
| 570024 ||  || — || January 25, 2006 || Kitt Peak || Spacewatch || L5 || align=right | 10 km || 
|-id=025 bgcolor=#fefefe
| 570025 ||  || — || January 25, 2006 || Kitt Peak || Spacewatch || (2076) || align=right data-sort-value="0.71" | 710 m || 
|-id=026 bgcolor=#E9E9E9
| 570026 ||  || — || September 30, 2005 || Mauna Kea || Mauna Kea Obs. ||  || align=right | 2.5 km || 
|-id=027 bgcolor=#E9E9E9
| 570027 ||  || — || January 19, 2006 || Catalina || CSS ||  || align=right | 1.8 km || 
|-id=028 bgcolor=#E9E9E9
| 570028 ||  || — || January 23, 2006 || Kitt Peak || Spacewatch ||  || align=right | 1.6 km || 
|-id=029 bgcolor=#fefefe
| 570029 ||  || — || January 28, 2006 || Mount Lemmon || Mount Lemmon Survey ||  || align=right data-sort-value="0.68" | 680 m || 
|-id=030 bgcolor=#fefefe
| 570030 ||  || — || January 30, 2006 || Kitt Peak || Spacewatch ||  || align=right data-sort-value="0.59" | 590 m || 
|-id=031 bgcolor=#fefefe
| 570031 ||  || — || January 30, 2006 || Kitt Peak || Spacewatch ||  || align=right data-sort-value="0.68" | 680 m || 
|-id=032 bgcolor=#fefefe
| 570032 ||  || — || January 23, 2006 || Kitt Peak || Spacewatch ||  || align=right data-sort-value="0.56" | 560 m || 
|-id=033 bgcolor=#d6d6d6
| 570033 ||  || — || January 31, 2006 || Kitt Peak || Spacewatch ||  || align=right | 2.9 km || 
|-id=034 bgcolor=#E9E9E9
| 570034 ||  || — || December 2, 2005 || Kitt Peak || L. H. Wasserman, R. Millis ||  || align=right | 1.5 km || 
|-id=035 bgcolor=#fefefe
| 570035 ||  || — || January 31, 2006 || Kitt Peak || Spacewatch ||  || align=right data-sort-value="0.68" | 680 m || 
|-id=036 bgcolor=#E9E9E9
| 570036 ||  || — || January 31, 2006 || Kitt Peak || Spacewatch ||  || align=right | 2.5 km || 
|-id=037 bgcolor=#E9E9E9
| 570037 ||  || — || January 31, 2006 || Kitt Peak || Spacewatch ||  || align=right | 2.0 km || 
|-id=038 bgcolor=#E9E9E9
| 570038 ||  || — || January 31, 2006 || Kitt Peak || Spacewatch ||  || align=right | 1.2 km || 
|-id=039 bgcolor=#E9E9E9
| 570039 ||  || — || January 31, 2006 || Kitt Peak || Spacewatch ||  || align=right | 2.7 km || 
|-id=040 bgcolor=#fefefe
| 570040 ||  || — || January 31, 2006 || Kitt Peak || Spacewatch ||  || align=right data-sort-value="0.65" | 650 m || 
|-id=041 bgcolor=#E9E9E9
| 570041 ||  || — || January 31, 2006 || Kitt Peak || Spacewatch ||  || align=right | 1.5 km || 
|-id=042 bgcolor=#fefefe
| 570042 ||  || — || January 21, 2006 || Kitt Peak || Spacewatch || H || align=right data-sort-value="0.54" | 540 m || 
|-id=043 bgcolor=#E9E9E9
| 570043 ||  || — || January 26, 2006 || Kitt Peak || Spacewatch ||  || align=right | 2.1 km || 
|-id=044 bgcolor=#fefefe
| 570044 ||  || — || January 27, 2006 || Mount Lemmon || Mount Lemmon Survey ||  || align=right data-sort-value="0.74" | 740 m || 
|-id=045 bgcolor=#fefefe
| 570045 ||  || — || February 15, 2013 || Haleakala || Pan-STARRS ||  || align=right data-sort-value="0.64" | 640 m || 
|-id=046 bgcolor=#fefefe
| 570046 ||  || — || December 7, 2008 || Mount Lemmon || Mount Lemmon Survey ||  || align=right data-sort-value="0.73" | 730 m || 
|-id=047 bgcolor=#E9E9E9
| 570047 ||  || — || December 21, 2014 || Haleakala || Pan-STARRS ||  || align=right | 1.6 km || 
|-id=048 bgcolor=#E9E9E9
| 570048 ||  || — || April 2, 2011 || Mount Lemmon || Mount Lemmon Survey ||  || align=right | 1.5 km || 
|-id=049 bgcolor=#E9E9E9
| 570049 ||  || — || December 21, 2014 || Mount Lemmon || Mount Lemmon Survey ||  || align=right | 2.1 km || 
|-id=050 bgcolor=#fefefe
| 570050 ||  || — || January 26, 2006 || Kitt Peak || Spacewatch ||  || align=right data-sort-value="0.56" | 560 m || 
|-id=051 bgcolor=#E9E9E9
| 570051 ||  || — || March 1, 2011 || Mount Lemmon || Mount Lemmon Survey ||  || align=right | 1.8 km || 
|-id=052 bgcolor=#E9E9E9
| 570052 ||  || — || January 28, 2015 || Haleakala || Pan-STARRS ||  || align=right | 1.3 km || 
|-id=053 bgcolor=#fefefe
| 570053 ||  || — || January 23, 2006 || Kitt Peak || Spacewatch ||  || align=right | 1.0 km || 
|-id=054 bgcolor=#d6d6d6
| 570054 ||  || — || January 23, 2006 || Kitt Peak || Spacewatch ||  || align=right | 1.7 km || 
|-id=055 bgcolor=#C2FFFF
| 570055 ||  || — || July 1, 2011 || Kitt Peak || Spacewatch || L5 || align=right | 7.3 km || 
|-id=056 bgcolor=#C2FFFF
| 570056 ||  || — || January 30, 2006 || Kitt Peak || Spacewatch || L5 || align=right | 6.8 km || 
|-id=057 bgcolor=#E9E9E9
| 570057 ||  || — || January 26, 2006 || Kitt Peak || Spacewatch ||  || align=right | 1.9 km || 
|-id=058 bgcolor=#E9E9E9
| 570058 ||  || — || January 30, 2006 || Kitt Peak || Spacewatch ||  || align=right | 1.5 km || 
|-id=059 bgcolor=#C2FFFF
| 570059 ||  || — || January 23, 2006 || Kitt Peak || Spacewatch || L5 || align=right | 6.8 km || 
|-id=060 bgcolor=#E9E9E9
| 570060 ||  || — || January 23, 2006 || Mount Lemmon || Mount Lemmon Survey ||  || align=right | 1.1 km || 
|-id=061 bgcolor=#E9E9E9
| 570061 ||  || — || January 23, 2006 || Kitt Peak || Spacewatch ||  || align=right | 1.5 km || 
|-id=062 bgcolor=#d6d6d6
| 570062 ||  || — || February 1, 2006 || Kitt Peak || Spacewatch || 7:4 || align=right | 3.7 km || 
|-id=063 bgcolor=#E9E9E9
| 570063 ||  || — || July 27, 2003 || Cerro Tololo || I. P. Griffin, A. Miranda ||  || align=right | 1.7 km || 
|-id=064 bgcolor=#d6d6d6
| 570064 ||  || — || February 1, 2006 || Kitt Peak || Spacewatch ||  || align=right | 2.3 km || 
|-id=065 bgcolor=#E9E9E9
| 570065 ||  || — || February 1, 2006 || Kitt Peak || Spacewatch ||  || align=right | 1.2 km || 
|-id=066 bgcolor=#d6d6d6
| 570066 ||  || — || February 1, 2006 || Kitt Peak || Spacewatch ||  || align=right | 3.9 km || 
|-id=067 bgcolor=#E9E9E9
| 570067 ||  || — || February 1, 2006 || Kitt Peak || Spacewatch ||  || align=right | 1.6 km || 
|-id=068 bgcolor=#E9E9E9
| 570068 ||  || — || January 23, 2006 || Mount Lemmon || Mount Lemmon Survey ||  || align=right | 1.5 km || 
|-id=069 bgcolor=#fefefe
| 570069 ||  || — || February 2, 2006 || Kitt Peak || Spacewatch ||  || align=right data-sort-value="0.63" | 630 m || 
|-id=070 bgcolor=#C2FFFF
| 570070 ||  || — || February 2, 2006 || Kitt Peak || Spacewatch || L5 || align=right | 6.7 km || 
|-id=071 bgcolor=#C2FFFF
| 570071 ||  || — || February 2, 2006 || Kitt Peak || Spacewatch || L5 || align=right | 9.2 km || 
|-id=072 bgcolor=#fefefe
| 570072 ||  || — || January 23, 2006 || Mount Lemmon || Mount Lemmon Survey ||  || align=right data-sort-value="0.68" | 680 m || 
|-id=073 bgcolor=#C2FFFF
| 570073 ||  || — || January 9, 2006 || Kitt Peak || Spacewatch || L5 || align=right | 12 km || 
|-id=074 bgcolor=#E9E9E9
| 570074 ||  || — || February 2, 2006 || Mount Lemmon || Mount Lemmon Survey ||  || align=right | 1.3 km || 
|-id=075 bgcolor=#E9E9E9
| 570075 ||  || — || October 1, 1995 || Kitt Peak || Spacewatch ||  || align=right | 1.5 km || 
|-id=076 bgcolor=#d6d6d6
| 570076 ||  || — || February 2, 2006 || Mount Lemmon || Mount Lemmon Survey ||  || align=right | 3.1 km || 
|-id=077 bgcolor=#E9E9E9
| 570077 ||  || — || October 24, 2005 || Mauna Kea || Mauna Kea Obs. ||  || align=right | 2.2 km || 
|-id=078 bgcolor=#E9E9E9
| 570078 ||  || — || February 2, 2006 || Kitt Peak || Spacewatch ||  || align=right | 2.7 km || 
|-id=079 bgcolor=#fefefe
| 570079 ||  || — || February 2, 2006 || Kitt Peak || Spacewatch ||  || align=right data-sort-value="0.64" | 640 m || 
|-id=080 bgcolor=#fefefe
| 570080 ||  || — || October 11, 2004 || Kitt Peak || L. H. Wasserman, J. R. Lovering ||  || align=right data-sort-value="0.77" | 770 m || 
|-id=081 bgcolor=#fefefe
| 570081 ||  || — || February 4, 2006 || Kitt Peak || Spacewatch ||  || align=right data-sort-value="0.48" | 480 m || 
|-id=082 bgcolor=#fefefe
| 570082 ||  || — || January 23, 2006 || Mount Lemmon || Mount Lemmon Survey ||  || align=right data-sort-value="0.55" | 550 m || 
|-id=083 bgcolor=#d6d6d6
| 570083 ||  || — || July 5, 2002 || Kitt Peak || Spacewatch ||  || align=right | 2.5 km || 
|-id=084 bgcolor=#E9E9E9
| 570084 ||  || — || February 4, 2006 || Mount Lemmon || Mount Lemmon Survey ||  || align=right data-sort-value="0.79" | 790 m || 
|-id=085 bgcolor=#E9E9E9
| 570085 ||  || — || February 4, 2006 || Mount Lemmon || Mount Lemmon Survey ||  || align=right | 1.4 km || 
|-id=086 bgcolor=#E9E9E9
| 570086 ||  || — || February 4, 2006 || Kitt Peak || Spacewatch ||  || align=right | 1.6 km || 
|-id=087 bgcolor=#fefefe
| 570087 ||  || — || February 2, 2006 || Mauna Kea || Mauna Kea Obs. ||  || align=right data-sort-value="0.64" | 640 m || 
|-id=088 bgcolor=#E9E9E9
| 570088 ||  || — || February 6, 2006 || Kitt Peak || Spacewatch ||  || align=right | 1.0 km || 
|-id=089 bgcolor=#fefefe
| 570089 ||  || — || February 4, 2006 || Kitt Peak || Spacewatch ||  || align=right data-sort-value="0.62" | 620 m || 
|-id=090 bgcolor=#C2FFFF
| 570090 ||  || — || January 27, 2006 || Mount Lemmon || Mount Lemmon Survey || L5 || align=right | 8.4 km || 
|-id=091 bgcolor=#E9E9E9
| 570091 ||  || — || March 29, 2011 || Mount Lemmon || Mount Lemmon Survey ||  || align=right | 1.7 km || 
|-id=092 bgcolor=#E9E9E9
| 570092 ||  || — || April 3, 2011 || Haleakala || Pan-STARRS ||  || align=right | 1.1 km || 
|-id=093 bgcolor=#E9E9E9
| 570093 ||  || — || November 16, 2009 || Mount Lemmon || Mount Lemmon Survey ||  || align=right | 1.5 km || 
|-id=094 bgcolor=#E9E9E9
| 570094 ||  || — || February 1, 2006 || Kitt Peak || Spacewatch ||  || align=right | 2.3 km || 
|-id=095 bgcolor=#d6d6d6
| 570095 ||  || — || December 28, 2011 || Kitt Peak || Spacewatch ||  || align=right | 2.5 km || 
|-id=096 bgcolor=#E9E9E9
| 570096 ||  || — || February 1, 2006 || Kitt Peak || Spacewatch ||  || align=right | 1.5 km || 
|-id=097 bgcolor=#E9E9E9
| 570097 ||  || — || January 28, 2014 || Kitt Peak || Spacewatch ||  || align=right | 1.2 km || 
|-id=098 bgcolor=#d6d6d6
| 570098 ||  || — || January 27, 2011 || Mount Lemmon || Mount Lemmon Survey ||  || align=right | 2.9 km || 
|-id=099 bgcolor=#fefefe
| 570099 ||  || — || June 29, 2014 || Haleakala || Pan-STARRS ||  || align=right data-sort-value="0.64" | 640 m || 
|-id=100 bgcolor=#E9E9E9
| 570100 ||  || — || November 20, 2009 || Mount Lemmon || Mount Lemmon Survey ||  || align=right | 1.0 km || 
|}

570101–570200 

|-bgcolor=#fefefe
| 570101 ||  || — || December 3, 2008 || Mount Lemmon || Mount Lemmon Survey ||  || align=right data-sort-value="0.57" | 570 m || 
|-id=102 bgcolor=#fefefe
| 570102 ||  || — || September 13, 2007 || Mount Lemmon || Mount Lemmon Survey ||  || align=right data-sort-value="0.76" | 760 m || 
|-id=103 bgcolor=#E9E9E9
| 570103 ||  || — || February 20, 2006 || Kitt Peak || Spacewatch ||  || align=right data-sort-value="0.93" | 930 m || 
|-id=104 bgcolor=#E9E9E9
| 570104 ||  || — || January 23, 2006 || Kitt Peak || Spacewatch ||  || align=right | 1.0 km || 
|-id=105 bgcolor=#E9E9E9
| 570105 ||  || — || January 23, 2006 || Kitt Peak || Spacewatch ||  || align=right | 1.2 km || 
|-id=106 bgcolor=#E9E9E9
| 570106 ||  || — || February 20, 2006 || Kitt Peak || Spacewatch ||  || align=right | 1.1 km || 
|-id=107 bgcolor=#d6d6d6
| 570107 ||  || — || January 23, 2006 || Mount Lemmon || Mount Lemmon Survey ||  || align=right | 2.5 km || 
|-id=108 bgcolor=#E9E9E9
| 570108 ||  || — || January 30, 2006 || Kitt Peak || Spacewatch ||  || align=right | 2.3 km || 
|-id=109 bgcolor=#d6d6d6
| 570109 ||  || — || February 24, 2006 || Kitt Peak || Spacewatch || 7:4 || align=right | 3.4 km || 
|-id=110 bgcolor=#fefefe
| 570110 ||  || — || February 24, 2006 || Palomar || NEAT ||  || align=right | 1.1 km || 
|-id=111 bgcolor=#E9E9E9
| 570111 ||  || — || February 24, 2006 || Mount Lemmon || Mount Lemmon Survey ||  || align=right | 2.1 km || 
|-id=112 bgcolor=#fefefe
| 570112 ||  || — || February 24, 2006 || Kitt Peak || Spacewatch ||  || align=right data-sort-value="0.70" | 700 m || 
|-id=113 bgcolor=#fefefe
| 570113 ||  || — || February 24, 2006 || Kitt Peak || Spacewatch ||  || align=right data-sort-value="0.86" | 860 m || 
|-id=114 bgcolor=#fefefe
| 570114 ||  || — || February 24, 2006 || Kitt Peak || Spacewatch ||  || align=right data-sort-value="0.74" | 740 m || 
|-id=115 bgcolor=#C2FFFF
| 570115 ||  || — || January 30, 2006 || Kitt Peak || Spacewatch || L5 || align=right | 7.5 km || 
|-id=116 bgcolor=#E9E9E9
| 570116 ||  || — || March 24, 2001 || Kitt Peak || M. W. Buie, S. D. Kern ||  || align=right | 1.8 km || 
|-id=117 bgcolor=#E9E9E9
| 570117 ||  || — || January 30, 2006 || Flagstaff || L. H. Wasserman ||  || align=right | 2.6 km || 
|-id=118 bgcolor=#E9E9E9
| 570118 ||  || — || February 24, 2006 || Kitt Peak || Spacewatch ||  || align=right | 1.5 km || 
|-id=119 bgcolor=#E9E9E9
| 570119 ||  || — || September 11, 2004 || Kitt Peak || Spacewatch ||  || align=right | 1.4 km || 
|-id=120 bgcolor=#E9E9E9
| 570120 ||  || — || September 30, 2003 || Kitt Peak || Spacewatch ||  || align=right | 2.2 km || 
|-id=121 bgcolor=#E9E9E9
| 570121 ||  || — || February 24, 2006 || Kitt Peak || Spacewatch ||  || align=right | 1.5 km || 
|-id=122 bgcolor=#fefefe
| 570122 ||  || — || February 25, 2006 || Mount Lemmon || Mount Lemmon Survey ||  || align=right data-sort-value="0.58" | 580 m || 
|-id=123 bgcolor=#E9E9E9
| 570123 ||  || — || February 25, 2006 || Mount Lemmon || Mount Lemmon Survey ||  || align=right data-sort-value="0.75" | 750 m || 
|-id=124 bgcolor=#fefefe
| 570124 ||  || — || February 25, 2006 || Kitt Peak || Spacewatch ||  || align=right data-sort-value="0.54" | 540 m || 
|-id=125 bgcolor=#E9E9E9
| 570125 ||  || — || February 25, 2006 || Kitt Peak || Spacewatch ||  || align=right | 2.1 km || 
|-id=126 bgcolor=#E9E9E9
| 570126 ||  || — || February 25, 2006 || Mount Lemmon || Mount Lemmon Survey ||  || align=right | 1.2 km || 
|-id=127 bgcolor=#E9E9E9
| 570127 ||  || — || October 31, 2005 || Kitt Peak || Spacewatch ||  || align=right | 2.1 km || 
|-id=128 bgcolor=#fefefe
| 570128 ||  || — || January 26, 2006 || Kitt Peak || Spacewatch ||  || align=right data-sort-value="0.72" | 720 m || 
|-id=129 bgcolor=#fefefe
| 570129 ||  || — || April 11, 1999 || Kitt Peak || Spacewatch ||  || align=right data-sort-value="0.62" | 620 m || 
|-id=130 bgcolor=#d6d6d6
| 570130 ||  || — || February 9, 2006 || Palomar || NEAT || EUP || align=right | 3.2 km || 
|-id=131 bgcolor=#E9E9E9
| 570131 ||  || — || February 25, 2006 || Mount Lemmon || Mount Lemmon Survey ||  || align=right | 2.3 km || 
|-id=132 bgcolor=#E9E9E9
| 570132 ||  || — || February 25, 2006 || Kitt Peak || Spacewatch ||  || align=right | 2.4 km || 
|-id=133 bgcolor=#E9E9E9
| 570133 ||  || — || February 25, 2006 || Kitt Peak || Spacewatch ||  || align=right | 1.7 km || 
|-id=134 bgcolor=#C2FFFF
| 570134 ||  || — || February 25, 2006 || Kitt Peak || Spacewatch || L5 || align=right | 8.0 km || 
|-id=135 bgcolor=#E9E9E9
| 570135 ||  || — || February 25, 2006 || Kitt Peak || Spacewatch ||  || align=right | 1.9 km || 
|-id=136 bgcolor=#E9E9E9
| 570136 ||  || — || February 25, 2006 || Mount Lemmon || Mount Lemmon Survey ||  || align=right | 1.7 km || 
|-id=137 bgcolor=#E9E9E9
| 570137 ||  || — || February 25, 2006 || Kitt Peak || Spacewatch || HOF || align=right | 2.5 km || 
|-id=138 bgcolor=#fefefe
| 570138 ||  || — || February 25, 2006 || Kitt Peak || Spacewatch ||  || align=right data-sort-value="0.65" | 650 m || 
|-id=139 bgcolor=#E9E9E9
| 570139 ||  || — || February 25, 2006 || Kitt Peak || Spacewatch ||  || align=right | 1.1 km || 
|-id=140 bgcolor=#E9E9E9
| 570140 ||  || — || January 22, 2006 || Mount Lemmon || Mount Lemmon Survey ||  || align=right | 1.4 km || 
|-id=141 bgcolor=#E9E9E9
| 570141 ||  || — || February 7, 2006 || Mount Lemmon || Mount Lemmon Survey ||  || align=right data-sort-value="0.86" | 860 m || 
|-id=142 bgcolor=#E9E9E9
| 570142 ||  || — || February 27, 2006 || Kitt Peak || Spacewatch ||  || align=right | 1.3 km || 
|-id=143 bgcolor=#E9E9E9
| 570143 ||  || — || February 27, 2006 || Mount Lemmon || Mount Lemmon Survey ||  || align=right | 1.6 km || 
|-id=144 bgcolor=#E9E9E9
| 570144 ||  || — || February 27, 2006 || Kitt Peak || Spacewatch ||  || align=right | 1.9 km || 
|-id=145 bgcolor=#E9E9E9
| 570145 ||  || — || December 3, 2005 || Mauna Kea || Mauna Kea Obs. ||  || align=right | 1.6 km || 
|-id=146 bgcolor=#E9E9E9
| 570146 ||  || — || February 27, 2006 || Kitt Peak || Spacewatch ||  || align=right | 1.8 km || 
|-id=147 bgcolor=#fefefe
| 570147 ||  || — || October 7, 2004 || Kitt Peak || Spacewatch ||  || align=right data-sort-value="0.82" | 820 m || 
|-id=148 bgcolor=#E9E9E9
| 570148 ||  || — || February 27, 2006 || Mount Lemmon || Mount Lemmon Survey ||  || align=right | 1.6 km || 
|-id=149 bgcolor=#E9E9E9
| 570149 ||  || — || February 27, 2006 || Mount Lemmon || Mount Lemmon Survey ||  || align=right | 1.8 km || 
|-id=150 bgcolor=#E9E9E9
| 570150 ||  || — || August 31, 2003 || Haleakala || AMOS ||  || align=right | 1.1 km || 
|-id=151 bgcolor=#E9E9E9
| 570151 ||  || — || February 27, 2006 || Mount Lemmon || Mount Lemmon Survey ||  || align=right data-sort-value="0.89" | 890 m || 
|-id=152 bgcolor=#E9E9E9
| 570152 ||  || — || February 27, 2006 || Kitt Peak || Spacewatch ||  || align=right | 1.7 km || 
|-id=153 bgcolor=#E9E9E9
| 570153 ||  || — || February 27, 2006 || Kitt Peak || Spacewatch ||  || align=right | 2.0 km || 
|-id=154 bgcolor=#E9E9E9
| 570154 ||  || — || September 18, 1999 || Kitt Peak || Spacewatch ||  || align=right | 2.3 km || 
|-id=155 bgcolor=#fefefe
| 570155 ||  || — || February 2, 2006 || Kitt Peak || Spacewatch ||  || align=right data-sort-value="0.63" | 630 m || 
|-id=156 bgcolor=#E9E9E9
| 570156 ||  || — || February 25, 2006 || Catalina || CSS ||  || align=right | 2.4 km || 
|-id=157 bgcolor=#d6d6d6
| 570157 ||  || — || February 25, 2006 || Mount Lemmon || Mount Lemmon Survey ||  || align=right | 2.6 km || 
|-id=158 bgcolor=#E9E9E9
| 570158 ||  || — || February 28, 2006 || Mount Lemmon || Mount Lemmon Survey ||  || align=right | 2.2 km || 
|-id=159 bgcolor=#fefefe
| 570159 ||  || — || February 25, 2006 || Kitt Peak || Spacewatch || NYS || align=right data-sort-value="0.47" | 470 m || 
|-id=160 bgcolor=#fefefe
| 570160 ||  || — || February 24, 2006 || Kitt Peak || Spacewatch ||  || align=right data-sort-value="0.77" | 770 m || 
|-id=161 bgcolor=#fefefe
| 570161 ||  || — || February 27, 2006 || Kitt Peak || Spacewatch ||  || align=right data-sort-value="0.63" | 630 m || 
|-id=162 bgcolor=#d6d6d6
| 570162 ||  || — || February 20, 2006 || Kitt Peak || Spacewatch ||  || align=right | 2.6 km || 
|-id=163 bgcolor=#d6d6d6
| 570163 ||  || — || February 25, 2006 || Kitt Peak || Spacewatch ||  || align=right | 2.4 km || 
|-id=164 bgcolor=#E9E9E9
| 570164 ||  || — || February 24, 2006 || Kitt Peak || Spacewatch ||  || align=right | 1.2 km || 
|-id=165 bgcolor=#E9E9E9
| 570165 ||  || — || February 27, 2006 || Kitt Peak || Spacewatch ||  || align=right | 1.8 km || 
|-id=166 bgcolor=#E9E9E9
| 570166 ||  || — || February 27, 2006 || Mount Lemmon || Mount Lemmon Survey ||  || align=right | 1.7 km || 
|-id=167 bgcolor=#C2FFFF
| 570167 ||  || — || September 24, 2012 || Mount Lemmon || Mount Lemmon Survey || L5 || align=right | 8.4 km || 
|-id=168 bgcolor=#d6d6d6
| 570168 ||  || — || February 24, 2006 || Mount Lemmon || Mount Lemmon Survey ||  || align=right | 3.4 km || 
|-id=169 bgcolor=#E9E9E9
| 570169 ||  || — || February 27, 2006 || Kitt Peak || Spacewatch ||  || align=right | 1.6 km || 
|-id=170 bgcolor=#fefefe
| 570170 ||  || — || February 27, 2006 || Kitt Peak || Spacewatch ||  || align=right data-sort-value="0.56" | 560 m || 
|-id=171 bgcolor=#d6d6d6
| 570171 ||  || — || March 2, 2006 || Kitt Peak || Spacewatch || 7:4 || align=right | 2.8 km || 
|-id=172 bgcolor=#E9E9E9
| 570172 ||  || — || March 2, 2006 || Kitt Peak || Spacewatch ||  || align=right | 1.8 km || 
|-id=173 bgcolor=#E9E9E9
| 570173 ||  || — || March 2, 2006 || Kitt Peak || Spacewatch ||  || align=right | 1.6 km || 
|-id=174 bgcolor=#fefefe
| 570174 ||  || — || March 2, 2006 || Kitt Peak || Spacewatch ||  || align=right data-sort-value="0.56" | 560 m || 
|-id=175 bgcolor=#E9E9E9
| 570175 ||  || — || March 2, 2006 || Mount Lemmon || Mount Lemmon Survey ||  || align=right | 2.6 km || 
|-id=176 bgcolor=#E9E9E9
| 570176 ||  || — || January 31, 2006 || Kitt Peak || Spacewatch ||  || align=right | 1.2 km || 
|-id=177 bgcolor=#E9E9E9
| 570177 ||  || — || March 3, 2006 || Kitt Peak || Spacewatch ||  || align=right | 1.8 km || 
|-id=178 bgcolor=#E9E9E9
| 570178 ||  || — || March 3, 2006 || Kitt Peak || Spacewatch ||  || align=right | 1.9 km || 
|-id=179 bgcolor=#E9E9E9
| 570179 ||  || — || February 20, 2006 || Kitt Peak || Spacewatch ||  || align=right | 2.1 km || 
|-id=180 bgcolor=#d6d6d6
| 570180 ||  || — || March 3, 2006 || Kitt Peak || Spacewatch ||  || align=right | 2.8 km || 
|-id=181 bgcolor=#E9E9E9
| 570181 ||  || — || March 3, 2006 || Kitt Peak || Spacewatch ||  || align=right | 1.8 km || 
|-id=182 bgcolor=#d6d6d6
| 570182 ||  || — || December 3, 2005 || Mauna Kea || Mauna Kea Obs. || 7:4 || align=right | 2.7 km || 
|-id=183 bgcolor=#E9E9E9
| 570183 ||  || — || December 3, 2005 || Mauna Kea || Mauna Kea Obs. ||  || align=right | 2.1 km || 
|-id=184 bgcolor=#E9E9E9
| 570184 ||  || — || March 4, 2006 || Mount Lemmon || Mount Lemmon Survey ||  || align=right | 1.8 km || 
|-id=185 bgcolor=#E9E9E9
| 570185 ||  || — || February 24, 2006 || Kitt Peak || Spacewatch ||  || align=right data-sort-value="0.86" | 860 m || 
|-id=186 bgcolor=#d6d6d6
| 570186 ||  || — || March 4, 2006 || Kitt Peak || Spacewatch ||  || align=right | 2.5 km || 
|-id=187 bgcolor=#fefefe
| 570187 ||  || — || January 19, 2013 || Kitt Peak || Spacewatch ||  || align=right data-sort-value="0.62" | 620 m || 
|-id=188 bgcolor=#E9E9E9
| 570188 ||  || — || March 4, 2006 || Kitt Peak || Spacewatch ||  || align=right | 2.0 km || 
|-id=189 bgcolor=#E9E9E9
| 570189 ||  || — || March 4, 2006 || Kitt Peak || Spacewatch ||  || align=right | 1.6 km || 
|-id=190 bgcolor=#E9E9E9
| 570190 ||  || — || March 4, 2006 || Kitt Peak || Spacewatch ||  || align=right | 1.8 km || 
|-id=191 bgcolor=#E9E9E9
| 570191 ||  || — || March 5, 2006 || Kitt Peak || Spacewatch ||  || align=right | 2.6 km || 
|-id=192 bgcolor=#E9E9E9
| 570192 ||  || — || February 27, 2006 || Mount Lemmon || Mount Lemmon Survey ||  || align=right | 1.1 km || 
|-id=193 bgcolor=#E9E9E9
| 570193 ||  || — || March 3, 2006 || Kitt Peak || Spacewatch ||  || align=right | 1.8 km || 
|-id=194 bgcolor=#E9E9E9
| 570194 ||  || — || October 10, 2008 || Mount Lemmon || Mount Lemmon Survey ||  || align=right | 2.2 km || 
|-id=195 bgcolor=#E9E9E9
| 570195 ||  || — || April 27, 2011 || Mount Lemmon || Mount Lemmon Survey ||  || align=right | 1.5 km || 
|-id=196 bgcolor=#E9E9E9
| 570196 ||  || — || October 6, 2004 || Kitt Peak || Spacewatch ||  || align=right | 1.3 km || 
|-id=197 bgcolor=#E9E9E9
| 570197 ||  || — || March 2, 2006 || Kitt Peak || Spacewatch ||  || align=right | 1.6 km || 
|-id=198 bgcolor=#E9E9E9
| 570198 ||  || — || January 18, 2015 || Haleakala || Pan-STARRS ||  || align=right | 1.3 km || 
|-id=199 bgcolor=#E9E9E9
| 570199 ||  || — || March 4, 2006 || Kitt Peak || Spacewatch ||  || align=right | 1.7 km || 
|-id=200 bgcolor=#fefefe
| 570200 ||  || — || March 4, 2006 || Kitt Peak || Spacewatch ||  || align=right data-sort-value="0.68" | 680 m || 
|}

570201–570300 

|-bgcolor=#fefefe
| 570201 ||  || — || March 8, 2006 || Mount Lemmon || Mount Lemmon Survey ||  || align=right data-sort-value="0.67" | 670 m || 
|-id=202 bgcolor=#fefefe
| 570202 ||  || — || March 2, 2006 || Kitt Peak || Spacewatch ||  || align=right data-sort-value="0.57" | 570 m || 
|-id=203 bgcolor=#E9E9E9
| 570203 ||  || — || March 24, 2006 || Kitt Peak || Spacewatch ||  || align=right | 1.2 km || 
|-id=204 bgcolor=#E9E9E9
| 570204 ||  || — || March 24, 2006 || Kitt Peak || Spacewatch ||  || align=right | 1.1 km || 
|-id=205 bgcolor=#fefefe
| 570205 ||  || — || March 25, 2006 || Kitt Peak || Spacewatch ||  || align=right data-sort-value="0.65" | 650 m || 
|-id=206 bgcolor=#fefefe
| 570206 ||  || — || March 25, 2006 || Kitt Peak || Spacewatch || H || align=right data-sort-value="0.49" | 490 m || 
|-id=207 bgcolor=#E9E9E9
| 570207 ||  || — || April 2, 2006 || Catalina || CSS ||  || align=right | 2.8 km || 
|-id=208 bgcolor=#E9E9E9
| 570208 ||  || — || April 1, 2011 || Kitt Peak || Spacewatch ||  || align=right | 2.8 km || 
|-id=209 bgcolor=#E9E9E9
| 570209 ||  || — || October 24, 2008 || Kitt Peak || Spacewatch ||  || align=right | 2.0 km || 
|-id=210 bgcolor=#E9E9E9
| 570210 ||  || — || March 5, 2006 || Kitt Peak || Spacewatch ||  || align=right | 2.1 km || 
|-id=211 bgcolor=#fefefe
| 570211 ||  || — || March 26, 2006 || Kitt Peak || Spacewatch ||  || align=right data-sort-value="0.65" | 650 m || 
|-id=212 bgcolor=#E9E9E9
| 570212 ||  || — || March 26, 2006 || Mount Lemmon || Mount Lemmon Survey ||  || align=right | 1.3 km || 
|-id=213 bgcolor=#E9E9E9
| 570213 ||  || — || March 23, 2006 || Kitt Peak || Spacewatch ||  || align=right | 1.6 km || 
|-id=214 bgcolor=#E9E9E9
| 570214 ||  || — || March 26, 2006 || Mount Lemmon || Mount Lemmon Survey ||  || align=right | 1.8 km || 
|-id=215 bgcolor=#fefefe
| 570215 ||  || — || March 24, 2006 || Mount Lemmon || Mount Lemmon Survey ||  || align=right data-sort-value="0.60" | 600 m || 
|-id=216 bgcolor=#E9E9E9
| 570216 ||  || — || February 19, 2014 || Mount Lemmon || Mount Lemmon Survey ||  || align=right | 1.3 km || 
|-id=217 bgcolor=#fefefe
| 570217 ||  || — || March 26, 2006 || Mount Lemmon || Mount Lemmon Survey ||  || align=right data-sort-value="0.60" | 600 m || 
|-id=218 bgcolor=#E9E9E9
| 570218 ||  || — || March 25, 2006 || Kitt Peak || Spacewatch ||  || align=right | 2.0 km || 
|-id=219 bgcolor=#E9E9E9
| 570219 ||  || — || March 25, 2006 || Kitt Peak || Spacewatch ||  || align=right | 1.7 km || 
|-id=220 bgcolor=#E9E9E9
| 570220 ||  || — || April 7, 2006 || Wrightwood || J. W. Young ||  || align=right | 2.0 km || 
|-id=221 bgcolor=#E9E9E9
| 570221 ||  || — || April 2, 2006 || Kitt Peak || Spacewatch ||  || align=right | 2.2 km || 
|-id=222 bgcolor=#fefefe
| 570222 ||  || — || February 24, 2006 || Kitt Peak || Spacewatch ||  || align=right data-sort-value="0.68" | 680 m || 
|-id=223 bgcolor=#E9E9E9
| 570223 ||  || — || April 2, 2006 || Kitt Peak || Spacewatch ||  || align=right | 2.0 km || 
|-id=224 bgcolor=#fefefe
| 570224 ||  || — || April 2, 2006 || Mount Lemmon || Mount Lemmon Survey ||  || align=right data-sort-value="0.67" | 670 m || 
|-id=225 bgcolor=#fefefe
| 570225 ||  || — || March 2, 2006 || Kitt Peak || Spacewatch ||  || align=right data-sort-value="0.55" | 550 m || 
|-id=226 bgcolor=#E9E9E9
| 570226 ||  || — || April 2, 2006 || Mount Lemmon || Mount Lemmon Survey ||  || align=right | 2.4 km || 
|-id=227 bgcolor=#E9E9E9
| 570227 ||  || — || April 7, 2006 || Junk Bond || D. Healy ||  || align=right | 1.7 km || 
|-id=228 bgcolor=#fefefe
| 570228 ||  || — || April 9, 2006 || Mount Lemmon || Mount Lemmon Survey || H || align=right data-sort-value="0.75" | 750 m || 
|-id=229 bgcolor=#fefefe
| 570229 ||  || — || August 20, 2014 || Haleakala || Pan-STARRS ||  || align=right data-sort-value="0.66" | 660 m || 
|-id=230 bgcolor=#E9E9E9
| 570230 ||  || — || April 2, 2006 || Mount Lemmon || Mount Lemmon Survey ||  || align=right | 1.7 km || 
|-id=231 bgcolor=#E9E9E9
| 570231 ||  || — || November 6, 2012 || Mount Lemmon || Mount Lemmon Survey ||  || align=right | 1.5 km || 
|-id=232 bgcolor=#d6d6d6
| 570232 ||  || — || April 7, 2006 || Kitt Peak || Spacewatch || 7:4 || align=right | 2.9 km || 
|-id=233 bgcolor=#E9E9E9
| 570233 ||  || — || March 3, 2006 || Kitt Peak || Spacewatch ||  || align=right | 1.6 km || 
|-id=234 bgcolor=#d6d6d6
| 570234 ||  || — || April 19, 2006 || Kitt Peak || Spacewatch || 7:4 || align=right | 4.0 km || 
|-id=235 bgcolor=#E9E9E9
| 570235 ||  || — || March 25, 2006 || Kitt Peak || Spacewatch ||  || align=right | 2.1 km || 
|-id=236 bgcolor=#fefefe
| 570236 ||  || — || April 7, 2006 || Kitt Peak || Spacewatch ||  || align=right data-sort-value="0.72" | 720 m || 
|-id=237 bgcolor=#E9E9E9
| 570237 ||  || — || April 21, 2006 || Kitt Peak || Spacewatch ||  || align=right | 2.1 km || 
|-id=238 bgcolor=#fefefe
| 570238 ||  || — || April 25, 2006 || Kitt Peak || Spacewatch ||  || align=right data-sort-value="0.68" | 680 m || 
|-id=239 bgcolor=#E9E9E9
| 570239 ||  || — || April 7, 2006 || Kitt Peak || Spacewatch ||  || align=right | 1.9 km || 
|-id=240 bgcolor=#E9E9E9
| 570240 ||  || — || April 24, 2006 || Kitt Peak || Spacewatch ||  || align=right | 1.7 km || 
|-id=241 bgcolor=#E9E9E9
| 570241 ||  || — || April 24, 2006 || Kitt Peak || Spacewatch ||  || align=right | 1.9 km || 
|-id=242 bgcolor=#E9E9E9
| 570242 ||  || — || April 25, 2006 || Kitt Peak || Spacewatch ||  || align=right | 2.5 km || 
|-id=243 bgcolor=#fefefe
| 570243 ||  || — || April 25, 2006 || Kitt Peak || Spacewatch ||  || align=right data-sort-value="0.72" | 720 m || 
|-id=244 bgcolor=#fefefe
| 570244 ||  || — || April 25, 2006 || Kitt Peak || Spacewatch ||  || align=right data-sort-value="0.88" | 880 m || 
|-id=245 bgcolor=#E9E9E9
| 570245 ||  || — || April 27, 2006 || Kitt Peak || Spacewatch ||  || align=right | 2.0 km || 
|-id=246 bgcolor=#fefefe
| 570246 ||  || — || April 28, 2006 || Socorro || LINEAR ||  || align=right | 1.1 km || 
|-id=247 bgcolor=#E9E9E9
| 570247 ||  || — || April 29, 2006 || Kitt Peak || Spacewatch ||  || align=right | 2.2 km || 
|-id=248 bgcolor=#E9E9E9
| 570248 ||  || — || April 29, 2006 || Kitt Peak || Spacewatch ||  || align=right | 1.3 km || 
|-id=249 bgcolor=#fefefe
| 570249 ||  || — || April 7, 2006 || Kitt Peak || Spacewatch ||  || align=right data-sort-value="0.60" | 600 m || 
|-id=250 bgcolor=#d6d6d6
| 570250 ||  || — || April 30, 2006 || Kitt Peak || Spacewatch ||  || align=right | 2.1 km || 
|-id=251 bgcolor=#E9E9E9
| 570251 ||  || — || April 30, 2006 || Kitt Peak || Spacewatch ||  || align=right | 1.8 km || 
|-id=252 bgcolor=#fefefe
| 570252 ||  || — || April 30, 2006 || Kitt Peak || Spacewatch ||  || align=right data-sort-value="0.59" | 590 m || 
|-id=253 bgcolor=#E9E9E9
| 570253 ||  || — || January 18, 2005 || Kitt Peak || Spacewatch ||  || align=right | 2.1 km || 
|-id=254 bgcolor=#fefefe
| 570254 ||  || — || March 26, 2006 || Mount Lemmon || Mount Lemmon Survey || MAS || align=right data-sort-value="0.60" | 600 m || 
|-id=255 bgcolor=#d6d6d6
| 570255 ||  || — || April 26, 2006 || Mount Lemmon || Mount Lemmon Survey ||  || align=right | 2.3 km || 
|-id=256 bgcolor=#E9E9E9
| 570256 ||  || — || April 26, 2006 || Kitt Peak || Spacewatch ||  || align=right | 2.0 km || 
|-id=257 bgcolor=#fefefe
| 570257 ||  || — || September 21, 2003 || Kitt Peak || Spacewatch ||  || align=right data-sort-value="0.81" | 810 m || 
|-id=258 bgcolor=#d6d6d6
| 570258 ||  || — || October 18, 2003 || Kitt Peak || Spacewatch ||  || align=right | 2.0 km || 
|-id=259 bgcolor=#fefefe
| 570259 ||  || — || May 2, 2006 || Mount Lemmon || Mount Lemmon Survey ||  || align=right data-sort-value="0.58" | 580 m || 
|-id=260 bgcolor=#E9E9E9
| 570260 ||  || — || April 30, 2006 || Kitt Peak || Spacewatch ||  || align=right | 1.6 km || 
|-id=261 bgcolor=#E9E9E9
| 570261 ||  || — || April 26, 2006 || Cerro Tololo || Cerro Tololo Obs. ||  || align=right | 1.7 km || 
|-id=262 bgcolor=#fefefe
| 570262 ||  || — || April 26, 2006 || Cerro Tololo || Cerro Tololo Obs. ||  || align=right data-sort-value="0.60" | 600 m || 
|-id=263 bgcolor=#E9E9E9
| 570263 ||  || — || January 30, 2006 || Kitt Peak || Spacewatch ||  || align=right | 1.7 km || 
|-id=264 bgcolor=#E9E9E9
| 570264 ||  || — || January 31, 2006 || Kitt Peak || Spacewatch ||  || align=right | 1.8 km || 
|-id=265 bgcolor=#fefefe
| 570265 ||  || — || April 27, 2006 || Cerro Tololo || Cerro Tololo Obs. ||  || align=right data-sort-value="0.61" | 610 m || 
|-id=266 bgcolor=#fefefe
| 570266 ||  || — || May 2, 2006 || Mount Lemmon || Mount Lemmon Survey ||  || align=right data-sort-value="0.74" | 740 m || 
|-id=267 bgcolor=#fefefe
| 570267 ||  || — || April 29, 2006 || Kitt Peak || Spacewatch ||  || align=right data-sort-value="0.47" | 470 m || 
|-id=268 bgcolor=#fefefe
| 570268 ||  || — || December 7, 2015 || Haleakala || Pan-STARRS || H || align=right data-sort-value="0.59" | 590 m || 
|-id=269 bgcolor=#E9E9E9
| 570269 ||  || — || October 17, 2012 || Haleakala || Pan-STARRS ||  || align=right | 1.1 km || 
|-id=270 bgcolor=#E9E9E9
| 570270 ||  || — || October 16, 2003 || Kitt Peak || Spacewatch ||  || align=right | 2.0 km || 
|-id=271 bgcolor=#d6d6d6
| 570271 ||  || — || May 1, 2006 || Kitt Peak || Spacewatch ||  || align=right | 2.2 km || 
|-id=272 bgcolor=#fefefe
| 570272 ||  || — || May 1, 2006 || Kitt Peak || Spacewatch || H || align=right data-sort-value="0.49" | 490 m || 
|-id=273 bgcolor=#d6d6d6
| 570273 ||  || — || May 2, 2006 || Mount Lemmon || Mount Lemmon Survey ||  || align=right | 2.5 km || 
|-id=274 bgcolor=#E9E9E9
| 570274 ||  || — || May 7, 2006 || Mount Lemmon || Mount Lemmon Survey ||  || align=right | 1.7 km || 
|-id=275 bgcolor=#fefefe
| 570275 ||  || — || April 21, 2006 || Kitt Peak || Spacewatch ||  || align=right data-sort-value="0.74" | 740 m || 
|-id=276 bgcolor=#fefefe
| 570276 ||  || — || May 3, 2006 || Mount Lemmon || Mount Lemmon Survey ||  || align=right data-sort-value="0.71" | 710 m || 
|-id=277 bgcolor=#E9E9E9
| 570277 ||  || — || April 7, 2006 || Anderson Mesa || LONEOS ||  || align=right | 2.8 km || 
|-id=278 bgcolor=#C2FFFF
| 570278 ||  || — || January 5, 2006 || Mount Lemmon || Mount Lemmon Survey || L5 || align=right | 8.4 km || 
|-id=279 bgcolor=#E9E9E9
| 570279 ||  || — || May 1, 2006 || Kitt Peak || D. E. Trilling ||  || align=right | 1.4 km || 
|-id=280 bgcolor=#d6d6d6
| 570280 ||  || — || May 1, 2006 || Mauna Kea || Mauna Kea Obs. ||  || align=right | 1.8 km || 
|-id=281 bgcolor=#fefefe
| 570281 ||  || — || January 31, 2009 || Kitt Peak || Spacewatch ||  || align=right data-sort-value="0.70" | 700 m || 
|-id=282 bgcolor=#E9E9E9
| 570282 ||  || — || October 17, 2012 || Haleakala || Pan-STARRS ||  || align=right | 1.3 km || 
|-id=283 bgcolor=#E9E9E9
| 570283 ||  || — || February 23, 2015 || Haleakala || Pan-STARRS ||  || align=right | 2.2 km || 
|-id=284 bgcolor=#fefefe
| 570284 ||  || — || September 6, 2013 || Mount Lemmon || Mount Lemmon Survey ||  || align=right data-sort-value="0.47" | 470 m || 
|-id=285 bgcolor=#E9E9E9
| 570285 ||  || — || July 30, 2008 || Kitt Peak || Spacewatch ||  || align=right | 1.6 km || 
|-id=286 bgcolor=#fefefe
| 570286 ||  || — || March 19, 2013 || Palomar || PTF ||  || align=right data-sort-value="0.67" | 670 m || 
|-id=287 bgcolor=#E9E9E9
| 570287 ||  || — || May 2, 2006 || Mount Lemmon || Mount Lemmon Survey ||  || align=right | 1.6 km || 
|-id=288 bgcolor=#E9E9E9
| 570288 ||  || — || October 10, 2007 || Kitt Peak || Spacewatch ||  || align=right | 1.2 km || 
|-id=289 bgcolor=#fefefe
| 570289 ||  || — || January 25, 2009 || Kitt Peak || Spacewatch ||  || align=right data-sort-value="0.51" | 510 m || 
|-id=290 bgcolor=#fefefe
| 570290 ||  || — || May 8, 2006 || Kitt Peak || Spacewatch ||  || align=right data-sort-value="0.68" | 680 m || 
|-id=291 bgcolor=#E9E9E9
| 570291 ||  || — || September 21, 2012 || Mount Lemmon || Mount Lemmon Survey ||  || align=right | 1.7 km || 
|-id=292 bgcolor=#E9E9E9
| 570292 ||  || — || August 26, 2012 || Haleakala || Pan-STARRS ||  || align=right | 1.7 km || 
|-id=293 bgcolor=#E9E9E9
| 570293 ||  || — || February 16, 2015 || Haleakala || Pan-STARRS ||  || align=right | 1.8 km || 
|-id=294 bgcolor=#fefefe
| 570294 ||  || — || May 5, 2006 || Kitt Peak || Spacewatch ||  || align=right data-sort-value="0.65" | 650 m || 
|-id=295 bgcolor=#E9E9E9
| 570295 ||  || — || February 16, 2005 || La Silla || A. Boattini || AGN || align=right | 1.3 km || 
|-id=296 bgcolor=#E9E9E9
| 570296 ||  || — || February 14, 2005 || Kitt Peak || Spacewatch ||  || align=right | 2.1 km || 
|-id=297 bgcolor=#E9E9E9
| 570297 ||  || — || May 20, 2006 || Kitt Peak || Spacewatch ||  || align=right | 2.0 km || 
|-id=298 bgcolor=#fefefe
| 570298 ||  || — || May 22, 2006 || Kitt Peak || Spacewatch || H || align=right data-sort-value="0.59" | 590 m || 
|-id=299 bgcolor=#fefefe
| 570299 ||  || — || May 20, 2006 || Kitt Peak || Spacewatch ||  || align=right data-sort-value="0.82" | 820 m || 
|-id=300 bgcolor=#fefefe
| 570300 ||  || — || May 21, 2006 || Kitt Peak || Spacewatch ||  || align=right data-sort-value="0.69" | 690 m || 
|}

570301–570400 

|-bgcolor=#fefefe
| 570301 ||  || — || May 18, 2006 || Palomar || NEAT || PHO || align=right | 1.0 km || 
|-id=302 bgcolor=#E9E9E9
| 570302 ||  || — || May 21, 2006 || Kitt Peak || Spacewatch ||  || align=right | 1.2 km || 
|-id=303 bgcolor=#E9E9E9
| 570303 ||  || — || May 21, 2006 || Mount Lemmon || Mount Lemmon Survey ||  || align=right | 2.1 km || 
|-id=304 bgcolor=#E9E9E9
| 570304 ||  || — || May 21, 2006 || Kitt Peak || Spacewatch ||  || align=right | 1.4 km || 
|-id=305 bgcolor=#E9E9E9
| 570305 ||  || — || May 21, 2006 || Mount Lemmon || Mount Lemmon Survey ||  || align=right | 2.7 km || 
|-id=306 bgcolor=#E9E9E9
| 570306 ||  || — || May 21, 2006 || Kitt Peak || Spacewatch ||  || align=right | 1.5 km || 
|-id=307 bgcolor=#E9E9E9
| 570307 ||  || — || May 8, 2006 || Kitt Peak || Spacewatch ||  || align=right | 2.0 km || 
|-id=308 bgcolor=#d6d6d6
| 570308 ||  || — || May 21, 2006 || Kitt Peak || Spacewatch ||  || align=right | 2.2 km || 
|-id=309 bgcolor=#E9E9E9
| 570309 ||  || — || May 22, 2006 || Kitt Peak || Spacewatch ||  || align=right | 1.6 km || 
|-id=310 bgcolor=#fefefe
| 570310 ||  || — || May 22, 2006 || Kitt Peak || Spacewatch ||  || align=right data-sort-value="0.60" | 600 m || 
|-id=311 bgcolor=#E9E9E9
| 570311 ||  || — || May 22, 2006 || Kitt Peak || Spacewatch ||  || align=right | 2.1 km || 
|-id=312 bgcolor=#fefefe
| 570312 ||  || — || May 24, 2006 || Kitt Peak || Spacewatch ||  || align=right data-sort-value="0.72" | 720 m || 
|-id=313 bgcolor=#E9E9E9
| 570313 ||  || — || May 22, 2006 || Kitt Peak || Spacewatch ||  || align=right | 1.2 km || 
|-id=314 bgcolor=#E9E9E9
| 570314 ||  || — || May 22, 2006 || Kitt Peak || Spacewatch ||  || align=right | 2.0 km || 
|-id=315 bgcolor=#E9E9E9
| 570315 ||  || — || May 9, 2006 || Mount Lemmon || Mount Lemmon Survey ||  || align=right | 1.4 km || 
|-id=316 bgcolor=#fefefe
| 570316 ||  || — || September 30, 2003 || Kitt Peak || Spacewatch ||  || align=right data-sort-value="0.76" | 760 m || 
|-id=317 bgcolor=#fefefe
| 570317 ||  || — || May 24, 2006 || Mount Lemmon || Mount Lemmon Survey ||  || align=right data-sort-value="0.54" | 540 m || 
|-id=318 bgcolor=#E9E9E9
| 570318 ||  || — || May 6, 2006 || Mount Lemmon || Mount Lemmon Survey ||  || align=right | 1.4 km || 
|-id=319 bgcolor=#E9E9E9
| 570319 ||  || — || May 25, 2006 || Mount Lemmon || Mount Lemmon Survey ||  || align=right | 1.1 km || 
|-id=320 bgcolor=#E9E9E9
| 570320 ||  || — || May 8, 2006 || Mount Lemmon || Mount Lemmon Survey || GEF || align=right | 1.6 km || 
|-id=321 bgcolor=#fefefe
| 570321 ||  || — || April 20, 2006 || Mount Lemmon || Mount Lemmon Survey ||  || align=right data-sort-value="0.59" | 590 m || 
|-id=322 bgcolor=#fefefe
| 570322 ||  || — || May 21, 2006 || Kitt Peak || Spacewatch || H || align=right data-sort-value="0.54" | 540 m || 
|-id=323 bgcolor=#E9E9E9
| 570323 ||  || — || May 26, 2006 || Mount Lemmon || Mount Lemmon Survey ||  || align=right | 1.3 km || 
|-id=324 bgcolor=#E9E9E9
| 570324 ||  || — || May 23, 2006 || Kitt Peak || Spacewatch ||  || align=right | 2.9 km || 
|-id=325 bgcolor=#E9E9E9
| 570325 ||  || — || May 25, 2006 || Kitt Peak || Spacewatch ||  || align=right data-sort-value="0.78" | 780 m || 
|-id=326 bgcolor=#E9E9E9
| 570326 ||  || — || May 26, 2006 || Kitt Peak || Spacewatch ||  || align=right | 1.4 km || 
|-id=327 bgcolor=#d6d6d6
| 570327 ||  || — || March 25, 2006 || Kitt Peak || Spacewatch ||  || align=right | 1.9 km || 
|-id=328 bgcolor=#fefefe
| 570328 ||  || — || May 3, 2006 || Mount Lemmon || Mount Lemmon Survey ||  || align=right data-sort-value="0.68" | 680 m || 
|-id=329 bgcolor=#d6d6d6
| 570329 ||  || — || January 12, 2010 || Mount Lemmon || Mount Lemmon Survey ||  || align=right | 2.1 km || 
|-id=330 bgcolor=#E9E9E9
| 570330 ||  || — || May 4, 2006 || Kitt Peak || Spacewatch ||  || align=right | 1.8 km || 
|-id=331 bgcolor=#E9E9E9
| 570331 ||  || — || November 19, 2003 || Kitt Peak || Spacewatch ||  || align=right | 2.1 km || 
|-id=332 bgcolor=#fefefe
| 570332 ||  || — || April 7, 2006 || Kitt Peak || Spacewatch ||  || align=right data-sort-value="0.66" | 660 m || 
|-id=333 bgcolor=#d6d6d6
| 570333 ||  || — || May 31, 2006 || Kitt Peak || Spacewatch ||  || align=right | 2.4 km || 
|-id=334 bgcolor=#E9E9E9
| 570334 ||  || — || May 23, 2006 || Kitt Peak || Spacewatch ||  || align=right | 1.8 km || 
|-id=335 bgcolor=#E9E9E9
| 570335 ||  || — || May 9, 2006 || Mount Lemmon || Mount Lemmon Survey ||  || align=right | 2.2 km || 
|-id=336 bgcolor=#E9E9E9
| 570336 ||  || — || May 19, 2006 || Mount Lemmon || Mount Lemmon Survey ||  || align=right | 2.4 km || 
|-id=337 bgcolor=#d6d6d6
| 570337 ||  || — || May 25, 2006 || Mauna Kea || Mauna Kea Obs. ||  || align=right | 1.7 km || 
|-id=338 bgcolor=#E9E9E9
| 570338 ||  || — || May 25, 2006 || Mauna Kea || Mauna Kea Obs. ||  || align=right | 1.8 km || 
|-id=339 bgcolor=#d6d6d6
| 570339 ||  || — || May 25, 2006 || Mauna Kea || Mauna Kea Obs. ||  || align=right | 2.8 km || 
|-id=340 bgcolor=#fefefe
| 570340 ||  || — || May 23, 2006 || Mount Lemmon || Mount Lemmon Survey ||  || align=right data-sort-value="0.67" | 670 m || 
|-id=341 bgcolor=#d6d6d6
| 570341 ||  || — || May 19, 2006 || Mount Lemmon || Mount Lemmon Survey ||  || align=right | 2.6 km || 
|-id=342 bgcolor=#E9E9E9
| 570342 ||  || — || September 24, 2012 || Mount Lemmon || Mount Lemmon Survey ||  || align=right | 1.9 km || 
|-id=343 bgcolor=#d6d6d6
| 570343 ||  || — || October 3, 2013 || Kitt Peak || Spacewatch ||  || align=right | 2.9 km || 
|-id=344 bgcolor=#d6d6d6
| 570344 ||  || — || March 22, 2015 || Haleakala || Pan-STARRS ||  || align=right | 2.2 km || 
|-id=345 bgcolor=#fefefe
| 570345 ||  || — || December 26, 2011 || Mount Lemmon || Mount Lemmon Survey ||  || align=right data-sort-value="0.71" | 710 m || 
|-id=346 bgcolor=#fefefe
| 570346 ||  || — || May 8, 2014 || Haleakala || Pan-STARRS || H || align=right data-sort-value="0.47" | 470 m || 
|-id=347 bgcolor=#E9E9E9
| 570347 ||  || — || November 3, 2008 || Mount Lemmon || Mount Lemmon Survey ||  || align=right | 1.8 km || 
|-id=348 bgcolor=#d6d6d6
| 570348 ||  || — || October 27, 2008 || Kitt Peak || Spacewatch ||  || align=right | 2.1 km || 
|-id=349 bgcolor=#E9E9E9
| 570349 ||  || — || October 11, 2012 || Haleakala || Pan-STARRS ||  || align=right | 2.0 km || 
|-id=350 bgcolor=#E9E9E9
| 570350 ||  || — || May 27, 2006 || Kitt Peak || Spacewatch ||  || align=right | 1.7 km || 
|-id=351 bgcolor=#E9E9E9
| 570351 ||  || — || May 27, 2006 || Catalina || CSS ||  || align=right | 2.7 km || 
|-id=352 bgcolor=#fefefe
| 570352 ||  || — || June 7, 2006 || La Silla || G. Bourban ||  || align=right data-sort-value="0.82" | 820 m || 
|-id=353 bgcolor=#fefefe
| 570353 ||  || — || April 2, 2009 || Kitt Peak || Spacewatch ||  || align=right data-sort-value="0.72" | 720 m || 
|-id=354 bgcolor=#E9E9E9
| 570354 ||  || — || October 9, 2016 || Haleakala || Pan-STARRS ||  || align=right | 1.4 km || 
|-id=355 bgcolor=#E9E9E9
| 570355 ||  || — || June 17, 2006 || Kitt Peak || Spacewatch ||  || align=right | 1.3 km || 
|-id=356 bgcolor=#fefefe
| 570356 ||  || — || June 21, 2006 || Kitt Peak || Spacewatch ||  || align=right data-sort-value="0.78" | 780 m || 
|-id=357 bgcolor=#fefefe
| 570357 ||  || — || June 21, 2006 || Lulin || LUSS ||  || align=right data-sort-value="0.85" | 850 m || 
|-id=358 bgcolor=#fefefe
| 570358 ||  || — || June 22, 2006 || Palomar || NEAT ||  || align=right | 1.0 km || 
|-id=359 bgcolor=#E9E9E9
| 570359 ||  || — || December 9, 2012 || Haleakala || Pan-STARRS ||  || align=right | 1.6 km || 
|-id=360 bgcolor=#E9E9E9
| 570360 ||  || — || March 18, 2010 || Mount Lemmon || Mount Lemmon Survey ||  || align=right | 1.1 km || 
|-id=361 bgcolor=#d6d6d6
| 570361 ||  || — || May 25, 2006 || Mount Lemmon || Mount Lemmon Survey ||  || align=right | 2.4 km || 
|-id=362 bgcolor=#fefefe
| 570362 ||  || — || July 20, 2006 || Reedy Creek || J. Broughton ||  || align=right data-sort-value="0.86" | 860 m || 
|-id=363 bgcolor=#d6d6d6
| 570363 ||  || — || January 2, 2009 || Kitt Peak || Spacewatch ||  || align=right | 2.1 km || 
|-id=364 bgcolor=#d6d6d6
| 570364 ||  || — || July 21, 2006 || Mount Lemmon || Mount Lemmon Survey ||  || align=right | 1.7 km || 
|-id=365 bgcolor=#d6d6d6
| 570365 ||  || — || October 8, 2007 || Kitt Peak || Spacewatch ||  || align=right | 2.0 km || 
|-id=366 bgcolor=#C2FFFF
| 570366 ||  || — || October 1, 2008 || Mount Lemmon || Mount Lemmon Survey || L4 || align=right | 6.9 km || 
|-id=367 bgcolor=#FA8072
| 570367 ||  || — || August 6, 2006 || Anderson Mesa || LONEOS ||  || align=right data-sort-value="0.90" | 900 m || 
|-id=368 bgcolor=#d6d6d6
| 570368 ||  || — || August 12, 2006 || Palomar || NEAT ||  || align=right | 3.4 km || 
|-id=369 bgcolor=#fefefe
| 570369 ||  || — || August 14, 2006 || Siding Spring || SSS ||  || align=right data-sort-value="0.92" | 920 m || 
|-id=370 bgcolor=#d6d6d6
| 570370 ||  || — || August 15, 2006 || Palomar || NEAT ||  || align=right | 3.1 km || 
|-id=371 bgcolor=#fefefe
| 570371 ||  || — || August 12, 2006 || Palomar || NEAT ||  || align=right data-sort-value="0.66" | 660 m || 
|-id=372 bgcolor=#d6d6d6
| 570372 ||  || — || June 20, 2006 || Mount Lemmon || Mount Lemmon Survey ||  || align=right | 2.6 km || 
|-id=373 bgcolor=#E9E9E9
| 570373 ||  || — || July 21, 2006 || Catalina || CSS ||  || align=right | 1.3 km || 
|-id=374 bgcolor=#fefefe
| 570374 ||  || — || August 19, 2006 || Kitt Peak || Spacewatch ||  || align=right data-sort-value="0.85" | 850 m || 
|-id=375 bgcolor=#d6d6d6
| 570375 ||  || — || August 16, 2006 || Siding Spring || SSS ||  || align=right | 2.6 km || 
|-id=376 bgcolor=#fefefe
| 570376 ||  || — || August 21, 2006 || Palomar || NEAT || NYS || align=right data-sort-value="0.60" | 600 m || 
|-id=377 bgcolor=#d6d6d6
| 570377 ||  || — || July 21, 2006 || Catalina || CSS ||  || align=right | 3.4 km || 
|-id=378 bgcolor=#d6d6d6
| 570378 ||  || — || August 21, 2006 || Kitt Peak || Spacewatch ||  || align=right | 2.4 km || 
|-id=379 bgcolor=#fefefe
| 570379 ||  || — || August 19, 2006 || Kitt Peak || Spacewatch ||  || align=right data-sort-value="0.74" | 740 m || 
|-id=380 bgcolor=#d6d6d6
| 570380 ||  || — || August 20, 2006 || Palomar || NEAT ||  || align=right | 3.2 km || 
|-id=381 bgcolor=#fefefe
| 570381 ||  || — || November 20, 2003 || Kitt Peak || Spacewatch ||  || align=right data-sort-value="0.78" | 780 m || 
|-id=382 bgcolor=#d6d6d6
| 570382 ||  || — || August 17, 2006 || Palomar || NEAT || 3:2 || align=right | 4.8 km || 
|-id=383 bgcolor=#d6d6d6
| 570383 ||  || — || August 27, 2006 || Lulin || LUSS ||  || align=right | 2.2 km || 
|-id=384 bgcolor=#E9E9E9
| 570384 ||  || — || August 21, 2006 || Kitt Peak || Spacewatch ||  || align=right | 1.3 km || 
|-id=385 bgcolor=#d6d6d6
| 570385 ||  || — || August 21, 2006 || Kitt Peak || Spacewatch ||  || align=right | 2.4 km || 
|-id=386 bgcolor=#E9E9E9
| 570386 ||  || — || August 21, 2006 || Kitt Peak || Spacewatch ||  || align=right | 1.8 km || 
|-id=387 bgcolor=#fefefe
| 570387 ||  || — || August 23, 2006 || Palomar || NEAT ||  || align=right data-sort-value="0.62" | 620 m || 
|-id=388 bgcolor=#fefefe
| 570388 ||  || — || August 24, 2006 || Palomar || NEAT ||  || align=right data-sort-value="0.77" | 770 m || 
|-id=389 bgcolor=#fefefe
| 570389 ||  || — || August 17, 2006 || Palomar || NEAT ||  || align=right data-sort-value="0.92" | 920 m || 
|-id=390 bgcolor=#fefefe
| 570390 ||  || — || August 27, 2006 || Kitt Peak || Spacewatch ||  || align=right data-sort-value="0.91" | 910 m || 
|-id=391 bgcolor=#E9E9E9
| 570391 ||  || — || April 2, 2005 || Mount Lemmon || Mount Lemmon Survey ||  || align=right | 1.8 km || 
|-id=392 bgcolor=#d6d6d6
| 570392 ||  || — || August 28, 2006 || Kitt Peak || Spacewatch ||  || align=right | 2.3 km || 
|-id=393 bgcolor=#fefefe
| 570393 ||  || — || August 19, 2006 || Kitt Peak || Spacewatch ||  || align=right data-sort-value="0.92" | 920 m || 
|-id=394 bgcolor=#fefefe
| 570394 ||  || — || August 29, 2006 || Lulin || LUSS ||  || align=right data-sort-value="0.69" | 690 m || 
|-id=395 bgcolor=#FA8072
| 570395 ||  || — || August 22, 2006 || Palomar || NEAT ||  || align=right data-sort-value="0.73" | 730 m || 
|-id=396 bgcolor=#d6d6d6
| 570396 ||  || — || August 19, 2006 || Anderson Mesa || LONEOS ||  || align=right | 3.1 km || 
|-id=397 bgcolor=#fefefe
| 570397 ||  || — || August 17, 2006 || Palomar || NEAT ||  || align=right data-sort-value="0.82" | 820 m || 
|-id=398 bgcolor=#d6d6d6
| 570398 ||  || — || August 18, 2006 || Kitt Peak || Spacewatch ||  || align=right | 2.2 km || 
|-id=399 bgcolor=#d6d6d6
| 570399 ||  || — || August 19, 2006 || Kitt Peak || Spacewatch ||  || align=right | 2.1 km || 
|-id=400 bgcolor=#d6d6d6
| 570400 ||  || — || August 19, 2006 || Kitt Peak || Spacewatch ||  || align=right | 2.1 km || 
|}

570401–570500 

|-bgcolor=#fefefe
| 570401 ||  || — || August 19, 2006 || Kitt Peak || Spacewatch ||  || align=right data-sort-value="0.87" | 870 m || 
|-id=402 bgcolor=#d6d6d6
| 570402 ||  || — || August 19, 2006 || Kitt Peak || Spacewatch ||  || align=right | 2.5 km || 
|-id=403 bgcolor=#d6d6d6
| 570403 ||  || — || August 19, 2006 || Kitt Peak || Spacewatch ||  || align=right | 2.7 km || 
|-id=404 bgcolor=#d6d6d6
| 570404 ||  || — || August 19, 2006 || Kitt Peak || Spacewatch ||  || align=right | 2.5 km || 
|-id=405 bgcolor=#fefefe
| 570405 ||  || — || August 19, 2006 || Kitt Peak || Spacewatch || MAS || align=right data-sort-value="0.61" | 610 m || 
|-id=406 bgcolor=#E9E9E9
| 570406 ||  || — || October 20, 2011 || Mount Lemmon || Mount Lemmon Survey ||  || align=right | 2.1 km || 
|-id=407 bgcolor=#d6d6d6
| 570407 ||  || — || February 20, 2014 || Haleakala || Pan-STARRS ||  || align=right | 2.7 km || 
|-id=408 bgcolor=#fefefe
| 570408 ||  || — || September 16, 2010 || Mount Lemmon || Mount Lemmon Survey ||  || align=right data-sort-value="0.70" | 700 m || 
|-id=409 bgcolor=#d6d6d6
| 570409 ||  || — || August 21, 2006 || Kitt Peak || Spacewatch ||  || align=right | 3.0 km || 
|-id=410 bgcolor=#d6d6d6
| 570410 ||  || — || August 29, 2006 || Kitt Peak || Spacewatch ||  || align=right | 2.4 km || 
|-id=411 bgcolor=#E9E9E9
| 570411 ||  || — || August 19, 2006 || Kitt Peak || Spacewatch ||  || align=right | 1.8 km || 
|-id=412 bgcolor=#d6d6d6
| 570412 ||  || — || August 27, 2006 || Kitt Peak || Spacewatch ||  || align=right | 2.4 km || 
|-id=413 bgcolor=#d6d6d6
| 570413 ||  || — || August 28, 2006 || Kitt Peak || Spacewatch ||  || align=right | 1.8 km || 
|-id=414 bgcolor=#d6d6d6
| 570414 ||  || — || August 19, 2006 || Kitt Peak || Spacewatch ||  || align=right | 2.4 km || 
|-id=415 bgcolor=#d6d6d6
| 570415 ||  || — || July 14, 2016 || Haleakala || Pan-STARRS ||  || align=right | 2.0 km || 
|-id=416 bgcolor=#E9E9E9
| 570416 ||  || — || January 31, 2009 || Kitt Peak || Spacewatch ||  || align=right | 1.9 km || 
|-id=417 bgcolor=#d6d6d6
| 570417 ||  || — || October 13, 2007 || Kitt Peak || Spacewatch || 3:2 || align=right | 3.7 km || 
|-id=418 bgcolor=#d6d6d6
| 570418 ||  || — || September 18, 2012 || Mount Lemmon || Mount Lemmon Survey ||  || align=right | 3.1 km || 
|-id=419 bgcolor=#fefefe
| 570419 ||  || — || August 19, 2006 || Kitt Peak || Spacewatch ||  || align=right data-sort-value="0.69" | 690 m || 
|-id=420 bgcolor=#fefefe
| 570420 ||  || — || August 28, 2006 || Kitt Peak || Spacewatch ||  || align=right data-sort-value="0.68" | 680 m || 
|-id=421 bgcolor=#d6d6d6
| 570421 ||  || — || August 28, 2006 || Kitt Peak || Spacewatch ||  || align=right | 2.4 km || 
|-id=422 bgcolor=#E9E9E9
| 570422 ||  || — || August 19, 2006 || Kitt Peak || Spacewatch ||  || align=right data-sort-value="0.63" | 630 m || 
|-id=423 bgcolor=#d6d6d6
| 570423 ||  || — || August 27, 2006 || Kitt Peak || Spacewatch ||  || align=right | 2.0 km || 
|-id=424 bgcolor=#d6d6d6
| 570424 ||  || — || August 19, 2006 || Kitt Peak || Spacewatch ||  || align=right | 2.2 km || 
|-id=425 bgcolor=#d6d6d6
| 570425 ||  || — || August 18, 2006 || Kitt Peak || Spacewatch ||  || align=right | 2.6 km || 
|-id=426 bgcolor=#fefefe
| 570426 ||  || — || August 19, 2006 || Kitt Peak || Spacewatch ||  || align=right data-sort-value="0.49" | 490 m || 
|-id=427 bgcolor=#d6d6d6
| 570427 ||  || — || September 14, 2006 || Kitt Peak || Spacewatch ||  || align=right | 2.5 km || 
|-id=428 bgcolor=#d6d6d6
| 570428 ||  || — || August 17, 2006 || Palomar || NEAT ||  || align=right | 2.3 km || 
|-id=429 bgcolor=#fefefe
| 570429 ||  || — || September 15, 2006 || Catalina || CSS || H || align=right data-sort-value="0.60" | 600 m || 
|-id=430 bgcolor=#FA8072
| 570430 ||  || — || September 15, 2006 || Palomar || NEAT ||  || align=right | 1.2 km || 
|-id=431 bgcolor=#E9E9E9
| 570431 ||  || — || September 14, 2006 || Kitt Peak || Spacewatch ||  || align=right | 1.7 km || 
|-id=432 bgcolor=#d6d6d6
| 570432 ||  || — || September 15, 2006 || Catalina || CSS ||  || align=right | 3.7 km || 
|-id=433 bgcolor=#d6d6d6
| 570433 ||  || — || August 29, 2006 || Kitt Peak || Spacewatch ||  || align=right | 1.9 km || 
|-id=434 bgcolor=#d6d6d6
| 570434 ||  || — || September 15, 2006 || Kitt Peak || Spacewatch ||  || align=right | 2.6 km || 
|-id=435 bgcolor=#d6d6d6
| 570435 ||  || — || September 15, 2006 || Kitt Peak || Spacewatch ||  || align=right | 2.0 km || 
|-id=436 bgcolor=#fefefe
| 570436 ||  || — || September 15, 2006 || Kitt Peak || Spacewatch || NYS || align=right data-sort-value="0.56" | 560 m || 
|-id=437 bgcolor=#d6d6d6
| 570437 ||  || — || September 15, 2006 || Kitt Peak || Spacewatch ||  || align=right | 1.6 km || 
|-id=438 bgcolor=#d6d6d6
| 570438 ||  || — || September 15, 2006 || Kitt Peak || Spacewatch ||  || align=right | 1.8 km || 
|-id=439 bgcolor=#d6d6d6
| 570439 ||  || — || September 15, 2006 || Kitt Peak || Spacewatch ||  || align=right | 2.4 km || 
|-id=440 bgcolor=#fefefe
| 570440 ||  || — || September 15, 2006 || Kitt Peak || Spacewatch || H || align=right data-sort-value="0.62" | 620 m || 
|-id=441 bgcolor=#d6d6d6
| 570441 ||  || — || September 15, 2006 || Kitt Peak || Spacewatch || EOS || align=right | 1.6 km || 
|-id=442 bgcolor=#d6d6d6
| 570442 ||  || — || September 15, 2006 || Kitt Peak || Spacewatch || EOS || align=right | 1.5 km || 
|-id=443 bgcolor=#d6d6d6
| 570443 ||  || — || September 15, 2006 || Kitt Peak || Spacewatch ||  || align=right | 2.6 km || 
|-id=444 bgcolor=#d6d6d6
| 570444 ||  || — || September 14, 2006 || Catalina || CSS ||  || align=right | 3.2 km || 
|-id=445 bgcolor=#d6d6d6
| 570445 ||  || — || August 16, 2006 || Palomar || NEAT || TEL || align=right | 1.8 km || 
|-id=446 bgcolor=#d6d6d6
| 570446 ||  || — || September 11, 2006 || Apache Point || SDSS Collaboration || EOS || align=right | 1.7 km || 
|-id=447 bgcolor=#d6d6d6
| 570447 ||  || — || September 19, 2006 || Kitt Peak || Spacewatch ||  || align=right | 2.3 km || 
|-id=448 bgcolor=#d6d6d6
| 570448 ||  || — || September 14, 2006 || Mauna Kea || J. Masiero, R. Jedicke || EOS || align=right | 1.2 km || 
|-id=449 bgcolor=#fefefe
| 570449 ||  || — || September 14, 2006 || Kitt Peak || Spacewatch ||  || align=right data-sort-value="0.62" | 620 m || 
|-id=450 bgcolor=#d6d6d6
| 570450 ||  || — || September 15, 2006 || Kitt Peak || Spacewatch ||  || align=right | 2.5 km || 
|-id=451 bgcolor=#fefefe
| 570451 ||  || — || September 16, 2006 || Kitt Peak || Spacewatch || H || align=right data-sort-value="0.59" | 590 m || 
|-id=452 bgcolor=#d6d6d6
| 570452 ||  || — || September 17, 2006 || Catalina || CSS ||  || align=right | 2.5 km || 
|-id=453 bgcolor=#d6d6d6
| 570453 ||  || — || August 19, 2006 || Anderson Mesa || LONEOS ||  || align=right | 3.6 km || 
|-id=454 bgcolor=#d6d6d6
| 570454 ||  || — || September 18, 2006 || Catalina || CSS ||  || align=right | 2.5 km || 
|-id=455 bgcolor=#d6d6d6
| 570455 ||  || — || August 19, 2006 || Kitt Peak || Spacewatch ||  || align=right | 2.9 km || 
|-id=456 bgcolor=#d6d6d6
| 570456 ||  || — || September 17, 2006 || Kitt Peak || Spacewatch ||  || align=right | 2.5 km || 
|-id=457 bgcolor=#E9E9E9
| 570457 ||  || — || September 17, 2006 || Kitt Peak || Spacewatch ||  || align=right | 1.7 km || 
|-id=458 bgcolor=#fefefe
| 570458 ||  || — || August 29, 2006 || Kitt Peak || Spacewatch ||  || align=right data-sort-value="0.59" | 590 m || 
|-id=459 bgcolor=#fefefe
| 570459 ||  || — || August 29, 2006 || Kitt Peak || Spacewatch ||  || align=right data-sort-value="0.80" | 800 m || 
|-id=460 bgcolor=#d6d6d6
| 570460 ||  || — || September 17, 2006 || Kitt Peak || Spacewatch ||  || align=right | 2.0 km || 
|-id=461 bgcolor=#d6d6d6
| 570461 ||  || — || September 18, 2006 || Kitt Peak || Spacewatch ||  || align=right | 4.5 km || 
|-id=462 bgcolor=#d6d6d6
| 570462 ||  || — || September 19, 2006 || Kitt Peak || Spacewatch ||  || align=right | 2.8 km || 
|-id=463 bgcolor=#fefefe
| 570463 ||  || — || September 17, 2006 || Catalina || CSS ||  || align=right data-sort-value="0.68" | 680 m || 
|-id=464 bgcolor=#d6d6d6
| 570464 ||  || — || September 17, 2006 || Kitt Peak || Spacewatch ||  || align=right | 2.9 km || 
|-id=465 bgcolor=#d6d6d6
| 570465 ||  || — || September 28, 2001 || Palomar || NEAT ||  || align=right | 2.2 km || 
|-id=466 bgcolor=#fefefe
| 570466 ||  || — || September 19, 2006 || Kitt Peak || Spacewatch ||  || align=right data-sort-value="0.80" | 800 m || 
|-id=467 bgcolor=#d6d6d6
| 570467 ||  || — || September 19, 2006 || Kitt Peak || Spacewatch || 3:2 || align=right | 4.2 km || 
|-id=468 bgcolor=#d6d6d6
| 570468 ||  || — || September 18, 2006 || Kitt Peak || Spacewatch ||  || align=right | 2.1 km || 
|-id=469 bgcolor=#d6d6d6
| 570469 ||  || — || September 18, 2006 || Kitt Peak || Spacewatch ||  || align=right | 1.7 km || 
|-id=470 bgcolor=#d6d6d6
| 570470 ||  || — || September 18, 2006 || Kitt Peak || Spacewatch ||  || align=right | 2.2 km || 
|-id=471 bgcolor=#d6d6d6
| 570471 ||  || — || September 28, 2011 || Mount Lemmon || Mount Lemmon Survey ||  || align=right | 2.1 km || 
|-id=472 bgcolor=#fefefe
| 570472 ||  || — || February 3, 2000 || Kitt Peak || Spacewatch ||  || align=right data-sort-value="0.69" | 690 m || 
|-id=473 bgcolor=#d6d6d6
| 570473 ||  || — || September 18, 2006 || Kitt Peak || Spacewatch ||  || align=right | 2.2 km || 
|-id=474 bgcolor=#d6d6d6
| 570474 ||  || — || September 18, 2006 || Kitt Peak || Spacewatch ||  || align=right | 2.2 km || 
|-id=475 bgcolor=#d6d6d6
| 570475 ||  || — || September 18, 2006 || Kitt Peak || Spacewatch ||  || align=right | 1.9 km || 
|-id=476 bgcolor=#d6d6d6
| 570476 ||  || — || September 19, 2006 || Kitt Peak || Spacewatch ||  || align=right | 1.8 km || 
|-id=477 bgcolor=#fefefe
| 570477 ||  || — || September 19, 2006 || Kitt Peak || Spacewatch ||  || align=right data-sort-value="0.75" | 750 m || 
|-id=478 bgcolor=#d6d6d6
| 570478 ||  || — || September 22, 2006 || Anderson Mesa || LONEOS || Tj (2.99) || align=right | 2.8 km || 
|-id=479 bgcolor=#d6d6d6
| 570479 ||  || — || November 8, 2007 || Mount Lemmon || Mount Lemmon Survey ||  || align=right | 3.5 km || 
|-id=480 bgcolor=#d6d6d6
| 570480 ||  || — || September 19, 2006 || Kitt Peak || Spacewatch ||  || align=right | 2.3 km || 
|-id=481 bgcolor=#fefefe
| 570481 ||  || — || September 19, 2006 || Kitt Peak || Spacewatch ||  || align=right data-sort-value="0.55" | 550 m || 
|-id=482 bgcolor=#d6d6d6
| 570482 ||  || — || September 19, 2006 || Kitt Peak || Spacewatch ||  || align=right | 2.0 km || 
|-id=483 bgcolor=#d6d6d6
| 570483 ||  || — || September 23, 2006 || Kitt Peak || Spacewatch || KOR || align=right | 1.2 km || 
|-id=484 bgcolor=#d6d6d6
| 570484 ||  || — || September 24, 2006 || Kitt Peak || Spacewatch ||  || align=right | 1.7 km || 
|-id=485 bgcolor=#d6d6d6
| 570485 ||  || — || September 24, 2006 || Bergisch Gladbach || W. Bickel ||  || align=right | 1.9 km || 
|-id=486 bgcolor=#d6d6d6
| 570486 ||  || — || September 17, 2006 || Kitt Peak || Spacewatch ||  || align=right | 2.5 km || 
|-id=487 bgcolor=#d6d6d6
| 570487 ||  || — || September 25, 2006 || Kitt Peak || Spacewatch ||  || align=right | 2.1 km || 
|-id=488 bgcolor=#fefefe
| 570488 ||  || — || September 25, 2006 || Kitt Peak || Spacewatch ||  || align=right data-sort-value="0.43" | 430 m || 
|-id=489 bgcolor=#E9E9E9
| 570489 ||  || — || September 25, 2006 || Kitt Peak || Spacewatch ||  || align=right | 1.9 km || 
|-id=490 bgcolor=#d6d6d6
| 570490 ||  || — || April 14, 2004 || Kitt Peak || Spacewatch ||  || align=right | 2.2 km || 
|-id=491 bgcolor=#d6d6d6
| 570491 ||  || — || September 25, 2006 || Kitt Peak || Spacewatch ||  || align=right | 2.0 km || 
|-id=492 bgcolor=#d6d6d6
| 570492 ||  || — || July 5, 2000 || Kitt Peak || Spacewatch ||  || align=right | 2.6 km || 
|-id=493 bgcolor=#d6d6d6
| 570493 ||  || — || September 25, 2006 || Kitt Peak || Spacewatch ||  || align=right | 2.1 km || 
|-id=494 bgcolor=#d6d6d6
| 570494 ||  || — || September 25, 2006 || Mount Lemmon || Mount Lemmon Survey ||  || align=right | 2.8 km || 
|-id=495 bgcolor=#d6d6d6
| 570495 ||  || — || September 25, 2006 || Kitt Peak || Spacewatch ||  || align=right | 1.6 km || 
|-id=496 bgcolor=#d6d6d6
| 570496 ||  || — || September 18, 2006 || Kitt Peak || Spacewatch ||  || align=right | 2.4 km || 
|-id=497 bgcolor=#d6d6d6
| 570497 ||  || — || September 26, 2006 || Mount Lemmon || Mount Lemmon Survey ||  || align=right | 2.4 km || 
|-id=498 bgcolor=#E9E9E9
| 570498 ||  || — || September 26, 2006 || Mount Lemmon || Mount Lemmon Survey ||  || align=right data-sort-value="0.81" | 810 m || 
|-id=499 bgcolor=#E9E9E9
| 570499 ||  || — || September 19, 2006 || Kitt Peak || Spacewatch ||  || align=right | 2.0 km || 
|-id=500 bgcolor=#d6d6d6
| 570500 ||  || — || September 20, 2006 || Bergisch Gladbach || W. Bickel ||  || align=right | 2.8 km || 
|}

570501–570600 

|-bgcolor=#d6d6d6
| 570501 ||  || — || September 22, 1995 || Kitt Peak || Spacewatch ||  || align=right | 2.3 km || 
|-id=502 bgcolor=#d6d6d6
| 570502 ||  || — || September 25, 2006 || Mount Lemmon || Mount Lemmon Survey ||  || align=right | 2.8 km || 
|-id=503 bgcolor=#d6d6d6
| 570503 ||  || — || August 21, 2006 || Kitt Peak || Spacewatch ||  || align=right | 1.6 km || 
|-id=504 bgcolor=#d6d6d6
| 570504 ||  || — || September 23, 2006 || Kitt Peak || Spacewatch ||  || align=right | 2.0 km || 
|-id=505 bgcolor=#fefefe
| 570505 ||  || — || August 28, 2006 || Catalina || CSS ||  || align=right data-sort-value="0.68" | 680 m || 
|-id=506 bgcolor=#d6d6d6
| 570506 ||  || — || September 26, 2006 || Kitt Peak || Spacewatch ||  || align=right | 2.5 km || 
|-id=507 bgcolor=#d6d6d6
| 570507 ||  || — || September 18, 2006 || Kitt Peak || Spacewatch ||  || align=right | 2.9 km || 
|-id=508 bgcolor=#d6d6d6
| 570508 ||  || — || September 18, 2006 || Kitt Peak || Spacewatch ||  || align=right | 2.3 km || 
|-id=509 bgcolor=#d6d6d6
| 570509 ||  || — || September 26, 2006 || Kitt Peak || Spacewatch ||  || align=right | 1.9 km || 
|-id=510 bgcolor=#d6d6d6
| 570510 ||  || — || September 26, 2006 || Kitt Peak || Spacewatch || THM || align=right | 1.5 km || 
|-id=511 bgcolor=#d6d6d6
| 570511 ||  || — || October 15, 2001 || Kitt Peak || Spacewatch ||  || align=right | 2.5 km || 
|-id=512 bgcolor=#d6d6d6
| 570512 ||  || — || October 1, 1995 || Kitt Peak || Spacewatch ||  || align=right | 2.8 km || 
|-id=513 bgcolor=#d6d6d6
| 570513 ||  || — || September 15, 2006 || Kitt Peak || Spacewatch ||  || align=right | 2.5 km || 
|-id=514 bgcolor=#fefefe
| 570514 ||  || — || September 26, 2006 || Mount Lemmon || Mount Lemmon Survey ||  || align=right data-sort-value="0.60" | 600 m || 
|-id=515 bgcolor=#fefefe
| 570515 ||  || — || August 29, 2006 || Kitt Peak || Spacewatch ||  || align=right data-sort-value="0.65" | 650 m || 
|-id=516 bgcolor=#fefefe
| 570516 ||  || — || September 26, 2006 || Catalina || CSS ||  || align=right data-sort-value="0.91" | 910 m || 
|-id=517 bgcolor=#fefefe
| 570517 ||  || — || October 3, 2006 || Kitt Peak || Spacewatch || NYS || align=right data-sort-value="0.60" | 600 m || 
|-id=518 bgcolor=#d6d6d6
| 570518 ||  || — || August 21, 2006 || Kitt Peak || Spacewatch ||  || align=right | 2.3 km || 
|-id=519 bgcolor=#d6d6d6
| 570519 ||  || — || September 27, 2006 || Mount Lemmon || Mount Lemmon Survey ||  || align=right | 1.8 km || 
|-id=520 bgcolor=#d6d6d6
| 570520 ||  || — || October 15, 2001 || Apache Point || SDSS Collaboration ||  || align=right | 2.2 km || 
|-id=521 bgcolor=#fefefe
| 570521 ||  || — || April 17, 2005 || Kitt Peak || Spacewatch ||  || align=right data-sort-value="0.84" | 840 m || 
|-id=522 bgcolor=#fefefe
| 570522 ||  || — || September 27, 2006 || Kitt Peak || Spacewatch ||  || align=right data-sort-value="0.59" | 590 m || 
|-id=523 bgcolor=#d6d6d6
| 570523 ||  || — || September 17, 2006 || Kitt Peak || Spacewatch ||  || align=right | 2.8 km || 
|-id=524 bgcolor=#d6d6d6
| 570524 ||  || — || September 17, 2006 || Kitt Peak || Spacewatch ||  || align=right | 2.9 km || 
|-id=525 bgcolor=#d6d6d6
| 570525 ||  || — || September 17, 2006 || Kitt Peak || Spacewatch || 3:2 || align=right | 4.0 km || 
|-id=526 bgcolor=#d6d6d6
| 570526 ||  || — || September 14, 2006 || Kitt Peak || Spacewatch ||  || align=right | 2.2 km || 
|-id=527 bgcolor=#d6d6d6
| 570527 ||  || — || September 27, 2006 || Kitt Peak || Spacewatch ||  || align=right | 2.1 km || 
|-id=528 bgcolor=#fefefe
| 570528 ||  || — || September 28, 2006 || Kitt Peak || Spacewatch ||  || align=right data-sort-value="0.59" | 590 m || 
|-id=529 bgcolor=#d6d6d6
| 570529 ||  || — || September 28, 2006 || Mount Lemmon || Mount Lemmon Survey ||  || align=right | 2.5 km || 
|-id=530 bgcolor=#d6d6d6
| 570530 ||  || — || September 28, 2006 || Kitt Peak || Spacewatch ||  || align=right | 2.1 km || 
|-id=531 bgcolor=#d6d6d6
| 570531 ||  || — || September 28, 2006 || Kitt Peak || Spacewatch ||  || align=right | 2.1 km || 
|-id=532 bgcolor=#E9E9E9
| 570532 ||  || — || September 28, 2006 || Kitt Peak || Spacewatch ||  || align=right | 1.9 km || 
|-id=533 bgcolor=#d6d6d6
| 570533 ||  || — || September 28, 2006 || Kitt Peak || Spacewatch || TEL || align=right | 1.1 km || 
|-id=534 bgcolor=#d6d6d6
| 570534 ||  || — || September 28, 2006 || Kitt Peak || Spacewatch ||  || align=right | 2.6 km || 
|-id=535 bgcolor=#d6d6d6
| 570535 ||  || — || September 28, 2006 || Kitt Peak || Spacewatch ||  || align=right | 3.2 km || 
|-id=536 bgcolor=#fefefe
| 570536 ||  || — || September 28, 2006 || Kitt Peak || Spacewatch ||  || align=right data-sort-value="0.62" | 620 m || 
|-id=537 bgcolor=#d6d6d6
| 570537 ||  || — || September 30, 2006 || Mount Lemmon || Mount Lemmon Survey ||  || align=right | 2.3 km || 
|-id=538 bgcolor=#FA8072
| 570538 ||  || — || September 30, 2006 || Siding Spring || SSS ||  || align=right | 1.2 km || 
|-id=539 bgcolor=#d6d6d6
| 570539 ||  || — || September 16, 2006 || Apache Point || SDSS Collaboration ||  || align=right | 1.7 km || 
|-id=540 bgcolor=#fefefe
| 570540 ||  || — || September 11, 2006 || Apache Point || SDSS Collaboration ||  || align=right data-sort-value="0.80" | 800 m || 
|-id=541 bgcolor=#d6d6d6
| 570541 ||  || — || September 17, 2006 || Apache Point || SDSS Collaboration ||  || align=right | 1.8 km || 
|-id=542 bgcolor=#d6d6d6
| 570542 ||  || — || November 11, 2006 || Mount Lemmon || Mount Lemmon Survey ||  || align=right | 2.5 km || 
|-id=543 bgcolor=#d6d6d6
| 570543 ||  || — || September 17, 2006 || Apache Point || SDSS Collaboration ||  || align=right | 2.7 km || 
|-id=544 bgcolor=#d6d6d6
| 570544 ||  || — || September 17, 2006 || Apache Point || SDSS Collaboration || EOS || align=right | 1.6 km || 
|-id=545 bgcolor=#d6d6d6
| 570545 ||  || — || September 17, 2006 || Apache Point || SDSS Collaboration ||  || align=right | 2.4 km || 
|-id=546 bgcolor=#d6d6d6
| 570546 ||  || — || September 17, 2006 || Apache Point || SDSS Collaboration ||  || align=right | 2.1 km || 
|-id=547 bgcolor=#d6d6d6
| 570547 ||  || — || September 17, 2006 || Apache Point || SDSS Collaboration ||  || align=right | 2.2 km || 
|-id=548 bgcolor=#d6d6d6
| 570548 ||  || — || September 11, 2006 || Apache Point || SDSS Collaboration ||  || align=right | 2.0 km || 
|-id=549 bgcolor=#d6d6d6
| 570549 ||  || — || September 22, 2006 || Apache Point || SDSS Collaboration ||  || align=right | 1.7 km || 
|-id=550 bgcolor=#d6d6d6
| 570550 ||  || — || September 20, 2006 || Catalina || CSS ||  || align=right | 3.0 km || 
|-id=551 bgcolor=#d6d6d6
| 570551 ||  || — || September 17, 2006 || Catalina || CSS ||  || align=right | 2.8 km || 
|-id=552 bgcolor=#d6d6d6
| 570552 ||  || — || September 27, 2006 || Mount Lemmon || Mount Lemmon Survey ||  || align=right | 2.1 km || 
|-id=553 bgcolor=#d6d6d6
| 570553 ||  || — || September 30, 2006 || Mount Lemmon || Mount Lemmon Survey ||  || align=right | 2.2 km || 
|-id=554 bgcolor=#d6d6d6
| 570554 ||  || — || September 30, 2006 || Mount Lemmon || Mount Lemmon Survey ||  || align=right | 2.9 km || 
|-id=555 bgcolor=#d6d6d6
| 570555 ||  || — || September 26, 2006 || Mount Lemmon || Mount Lemmon Survey ||  || align=right | 2.1 km || 
|-id=556 bgcolor=#d6d6d6
| 570556 ||  || — || September 26, 2006 || Kitt Peak || Spacewatch ||  || align=right | 2.5 km || 
|-id=557 bgcolor=#fefefe
| 570557 ||  || — || December 1, 2014 || Haleakala || Pan-STARRS ||  || align=right data-sort-value="0.66" | 660 m || 
|-id=558 bgcolor=#fefefe
| 570558 ||  || — || September 28, 2006 || Kitt Peak || Spacewatch ||  || align=right data-sort-value="0.52" | 520 m || 
|-id=559 bgcolor=#d6d6d6
| 570559 ||  || — || September 17, 2006 || Kitt Peak || Spacewatch ||  || align=right | 2.3 km || 
|-id=560 bgcolor=#d6d6d6
| 570560 ||  || — || September 19, 2006 || Kitt Peak || Spacewatch ||  || align=right | 2.0 km || 
|-id=561 bgcolor=#d6d6d6
| 570561 ||  || — || September 18, 2006 || Kitt Peak || Spacewatch ||  || align=right | 2.0 km || 
|-id=562 bgcolor=#d6d6d6
| 570562 ||  || — || August 26, 2011 || Piszkesteto || K. Sárneczky ||  || align=right | 3.1 km || 
|-id=563 bgcolor=#fefefe
| 570563 ||  || — || October 24, 2013 || Mount Lemmon || Mount Lemmon Survey ||  || align=right data-sort-value="0.57" | 570 m || 
|-id=564 bgcolor=#fefefe
| 570564 ||  || — || May 16, 2009 || Mount Lemmon || Mount Lemmon Survey ||  || align=right data-sort-value="0.82" | 820 m || 
|-id=565 bgcolor=#E9E9E9
| 570565 ||  || — || September 19, 2006 || Kitt Peak || Spacewatch ||  || align=right | 1.9 km || 
|-id=566 bgcolor=#d6d6d6
| 570566 ||  || — || September 17, 2006 || Kitt Peak || Spacewatch ||  || align=right | 2.1 km || 
|-id=567 bgcolor=#d6d6d6
| 570567 ||  || — || December 18, 2007 || Nogales || P. R. Holvorcem, M. Schwartz ||  || align=right | 2.4 km || 
|-id=568 bgcolor=#d6d6d6
| 570568 ||  || — || March 16, 2009 || Mount Lemmon || Mount Lemmon Survey ||  || align=right | 2.1 km || 
|-id=569 bgcolor=#d6d6d6
| 570569 ||  || — || September 23, 2011 || Haleakala || Pan-STARRS ||  || align=right | 1.7 km || 
|-id=570 bgcolor=#fefefe
| 570570 ||  || — || September 28, 2006 || Kitt Peak || Spacewatch ||  || align=right data-sort-value="0.65" | 650 m || 
|-id=571 bgcolor=#fefefe
| 570571 ||  || — || November 26, 2014 || Haleakala || Pan-STARRS ||  || align=right data-sort-value="0.85" | 850 m || 
|-id=572 bgcolor=#d6d6d6
| 570572 ||  || — || September 19, 2006 || Kitt Peak || Spacewatch ||  || align=right | 1.8 km || 
|-id=573 bgcolor=#d6d6d6
| 570573 ||  || — || September 26, 2006 || Kitt Peak || Spacewatch ||  || align=right | 2.1 km || 
|-id=574 bgcolor=#d6d6d6
| 570574 ||  || — || September 17, 2006 || Kitt Peak || Spacewatch ||  || align=right | 2.1 km || 
|-id=575 bgcolor=#d6d6d6
| 570575 ||  || — || September 17, 2006 || Kitt Peak || Spacewatch ||  || align=right | 2.0 km || 
|-id=576 bgcolor=#d6d6d6
| 570576 ||  || — || September 28, 2006 || Kitt Peak || Spacewatch ||  || align=right | 2.0 km || 
|-id=577 bgcolor=#fefefe
| 570577 ||  || — || September 17, 2006 || Kitt Peak || Spacewatch ||  || align=right data-sort-value="0.51" | 510 m || 
|-id=578 bgcolor=#fefefe
| 570578 ||  || — || September 17, 2006 || Kitt Peak || Spacewatch ||  || align=right data-sort-value="0.65" | 650 m || 
|-id=579 bgcolor=#d6d6d6
| 570579 ||  || — || October 13, 2006 || Pla D'Arguines || R. Ferrando, M. Ferrando ||  || align=right | 2.8 km || 
|-id=580 bgcolor=#d6d6d6
| 570580 ||  || — || September 27, 2006 || Anderson Mesa || LONEOS ||  || align=right | 1.9 km || 
|-id=581 bgcolor=#d6d6d6
| 570581 ||  || — || September 26, 2006 || Mount Lemmon || Mount Lemmon Survey ||  || align=right | 2.2 km || 
|-id=582 bgcolor=#d6d6d6
| 570582 ||  || — || October 12, 2006 || Kitt Peak || Spacewatch ||  || align=right | 2.4 km || 
|-id=583 bgcolor=#d6d6d6
| 570583 ||  || — || October 13, 2006 || Kitt Peak || Spacewatch ||  || align=right | 1.7 km || 
|-id=584 bgcolor=#d6d6d6
| 570584 ||  || — || October 13, 2006 || Kitt Peak || Spacewatch ||  || align=right | 3.4 km || 
|-id=585 bgcolor=#d6d6d6
| 570585 ||  || — || September 20, 2006 || Bergisch Gladbach || W. Bickel || EOS || align=right | 1.4 km || 
|-id=586 bgcolor=#d6d6d6
| 570586 ||  || — || September 17, 2006 || Kitt Peak || Spacewatch ||  || align=right | 2.2 km || 
|-id=587 bgcolor=#d6d6d6
| 570587 ||  || — || October 4, 2006 || Mount Lemmon || Mount Lemmon Survey ||  || align=right | 3.0 km || 
|-id=588 bgcolor=#fefefe
| 570588 ||  || — || October 11, 2006 || Kitt Peak || Spacewatch ||  || align=right data-sort-value="0.69" | 690 m || 
|-id=589 bgcolor=#d6d6d6
| 570589 ||  || — || September 20, 2006 || Palomar || NEAT || EOS || align=right | 1.8 km || 
|-id=590 bgcolor=#d6d6d6
| 570590 ||  || — || September 21, 2001 || Apache Point || SDSS Collaboration || EOS || align=right | 2.4 km || 
|-id=591 bgcolor=#d6d6d6
| 570591 ||  || — || October 13, 2006 || Kitt Peak || Spacewatch ||  || align=right | 2.4 km || 
|-id=592 bgcolor=#fefefe
| 570592 ||  || — || October 3, 2006 || Mount Lemmon || Mount Lemmon Survey || H || align=right data-sort-value="0.62" | 620 m || 
|-id=593 bgcolor=#fefefe
| 570593 ||  || — || September 14, 2002 || Palomar || NEAT ||  || align=right data-sort-value="0.83" | 830 m || 
|-id=594 bgcolor=#d6d6d6
| 570594 ||  || — || October 15, 2006 || Kitt Peak || Spacewatch ||  || align=right | 2.9 km || 
|-id=595 bgcolor=#d6d6d6
| 570595 ||  || — || September 28, 2006 || Mount Lemmon || Mount Lemmon Survey ||  || align=right | 2.1 km || 
|-id=596 bgcolor=#d6d6d6
| 570596 ||  || — || October 1, 2006 || Apache Point || SDSS Collaboration ||  || align=right | 2.5 km || 
|-id=597 bgcolor=#d6d6d6
| 570597 ||  || — || October 1, 2006 || Apache Point || SDSS Collaboration ||  || align=right | 2.7 km || 
|-id=598 bgcolor=#d6d6d6
| 570598 ||  || — || October 1, 2006 || Apache Point || SDSS Collaboration || EOS || align=right | 1.6 km || 
|-id=599 bgcolor=#d6d6d6
| 570599 ||  || — || September 22, 2006 || Apache Point || SDSS Collaboration ||  || align=right | 2.9 km || 
|-id=600 bgcolor=#d6d6d6
| 570600 ||  || — || September 29, 2006 || Apache Point || SDSS Collaboration || EOS || align=right | 1.2 km || 
|}

570601–570700 

|-bgcolor=#d6d6d6
| 570601 ||  || — || September 19, 2006 || Apache Point || SDSS Collaboration || EOS || align=right | 1.7 km || 
|-id=602 bgcolor=#d6d6d6
| 570602 ||  || — || September 29, 2006 || Apache Point || SDSS Collaboration || EOS || align=right | 1.5 km || 
|-id=603 bgcolor=#d6d6d6
| 570603 ||  || — || September 19, 2006 || Apache Point || SDSS Collaboration || EOS || align=right | 1.0 km || 
|-id=604 bgcolor=#E9E9E9
| 570604 ||  || — || October 1, 2006 || Apache Point || SDSS Collaboration ||  || align=right data-sort-value="0.87" | 870 m || 
|-id=605 bgcolor=#d6d6d6
| 570605 ||  || — || September 11, 2006 || Apache Point || SDSS Collaboration || EOS || align=right | 1.5 km || 
|-id=606 bgcolor=#d6d6d6
| 570606 ||  || — || October 11, 2006 || Apache Point || SDSS Collaboration ||  || align=right | 3.0 km || 
|-id=607 bgcolor=#d6d6d6
| 570607 ||  || — || October 28, 2006 || Catalina || CSS ||  || align=right | 3.3 km || 
|-id=608 bgcolor=#d6d6d6
| 570608 ||  || — || October 1, 2006 || Apache Point || SDSS Collaboration ||  || align=right | 2.6 km || 
|-id=609 bgcolor=#d6d6d6
| 570609 ||  || — || October 11, 2006 || Apache Point || SDSS Collaboration || EOS || align=right | 2.0 km || 
|-id=610 bgcolor=#d6d6d6
| 570610 ||  || — || October 2, 2006 || Mount Lemmon || Mount Lemmon Survey ||  || align=right | 2.3 km || 
|-id=611 bgcolor=#d6d6d6
| 570611 ||  || — || October 2, 2006 || Mount Lemmon || Mount Lemmon Survey ||  || align=right | 2.1 km || 
|-id=612 bgcolor=#d6d6d6
| 570612 ||  || — || October 3, 2006 || Mount Lemmon || Mount Lemmon Survey ||  || align=right | 2.9 km || 
|-id=613 bgcolor=#d6d6d6
| 570613 ||  || — || February 7, 2008 || Kitt Peak || Spacewatch ||  || align=right | 2.4 km || 
|-id=614 bgcolor=#fefefe
| 570614 ||  || — || October 11, 2006 || Palomar || NEAT ||  || align=right data-sort-value="0.76" | 760 m || 
|-id=615 bgcolor=#d6d6d6
| 570615 ||  || — || October 2, 2006 || Kitt Peak || Spacewatch ||  || align=right | 2.3 km || 
|-id=616 bgcolor=#d6d6d6
| 570616 ||  || — || October 11, 2006 || Kitt Peak || Spacewatch ||  || align=right | 2.7 km || 
|-id=617 bgcolor=#E9E9E9
| 570617 ||  || — || October 4, 2006 || Mount Lemmon || Mount Lemmon Survey ||  || align=right | 2.1 km || 
|-id=618 bgcolor=#d6d6d6
| 570618 ||  || — || October 2, 2006 || Mount Lemmon || Mount Lemmon Survey ||  || align=right | 1.9 km || 
|-id=619 bgcolor=#d6d6d6
| 570619 ||  || — || October 2, 2006 || Mount Lemmon || Mount Lemmon Survey ||  || align=right | 3.2 km || 
|-id=620 bgcolor=#d6d6d6
| 570620 ||  || — || October 13, 2006 || Kitt Peak || Spacewatch ||  || align=right | 2.3 km || 
|-id=621 bgcolor=#d6d6d6
| 570621 ||  || — || October 18, 2006 || Piszkesteto || K. Sárneczky ||  || align=right | 2.7 km || 
|-id=622 bgcolor=#d6d6d6
| 570622 ||  || — || September 30, 2006 || Mount Lemmon || Mount Lemmon Survey ||  || align=right | 3.1 km || 
|-id=623 bgcolor=#d6d6d6
| 570623 ||  || — || September 25, 2006 || Mount Lemmon || Mount Lemmon Survey ||  || align=right | 2.3 km || 
|-id=624 bgcolor=#d6d6d6
| 570624 ||  || — || October 16, 2006 || Kitt Peak || Spacewatch ||  || align=right | 2.7 km || 
|-id=625 bgcolor=#E9E9E9
| 570625 ||  || — || October 16, 2006 || Kitt Peak || Spacewatch ||  || align=right | 1.8 km || 
|-id=626 bgcolor=#d6d6d6
| 570626 ||  || — || September 26, 2006 || Mount Lemmon || Mount Lemmon Survey ||  || align=right | 2.7 km || 
|-id=627 bgcolor=#d6d6d6
| 570627 ||  || — || September 30, 2006 || Mount Lemmon || Mount Lemmon Survey ||  || align=right | 2.3 km || 
|-id=628 bgcolor=#d6d6d6
| 570628 ||  || — || September 28, 2006 || Mount Lemmon || Mount Lemmon Survey ||  || align=right | 2.8 km || 
|-id=629 bgcolor=#d6d6d6
| 570629 ||  || — || October 16, 2006 || Kitt Peak || Spacewatch ||  || align=right | 2.4 km || 
|-id=630 bgcolor=#d6d6d6
| 570630 ||  || — || October 17, 2006 || Kitt Peak || Spacewatch ||  || align=right | 3.3 km || 
|-id=631 bgcolor=#E9E9E9
| 570631 ||  || — || October 17, 2006 || Kitt Peak || Spacewatch ||  || align=right | 1.1 km || 
|-id=632 bgcolor=#fefefe
| 570632 ||  || — || October 17, 2006 || Kitt Peak || Spacewatch ||  || align=right data-sort-value="0.90" | 900 m || 
|-id=633 bgcolor=#d6d6d6
| 570633 ||  || — || October 17, 2006 || Kitt Peak || Spacewatch ||  || align=right | 2.1 km || 
|-id=634 bgcolor=#fefefe
| 570634 ||  || — || October 19, 2006 || Kitt Peak || Spacewatch ||  || align=right data-sort-value="0.50" | 500 m || 
|-id=635 bgcolor=#d6d6d6
| 570635 ||  || — || October 16, 2006 || Mount Lemmon || Mount Lemmon Survey ||  || align=right | 1.9 km || 
|-id=636 bgcolor=#d6d6d6
| 570636 ||  || — || October 17, 2006 || Bergisch Gladbach || W. Bickel ||  || align=right | 2.2 km || 
|-id=637 bgcolor=#d6d6d6
| 570637 ||  || — || October 17, 2006 || Kitt Peak || Spacewatch ||  || align=right | 3.3 km || 
|-id=638 bgcolor=#fefefe
| 570638 ||  || — || September 27, 2006 || Mount Lemmon || Mount Lemmon Survey ||  || align=right data-sort-value="0.68" | 680 m || 
|-id=639 bgcolor=#d6d6d6
| 570639 ||  || — || October 18, 2006 || Kitt Peak || Spacewatch ||  || align=right | 2.4 km || 
|-id=640 bgcolor=#E9E9E9
| 570640 ||  || — || October 3, 2006 || Mount Lemmon || Mount Lemmon Survey ||  || align=right data-sort-value="0.71" | 710 m || 
|-id=641 bgcolor=#d6d6d6
| 570641 ||  || — || October 18, 2006 || Kitt Peak || Spacewatch ||  || align=right | 2.6 km || 
|-id=642 bgcolor=#FA8072
| 570642 ||  || — || September 19, 2006 || Kitt Peak || Spacewatch || H || align=right data-sort-value="0.49" | 490 m || 
|-id=643 bgcolor=#d6d6d6
| 570643 ||  || — || October 19, 2006 || Kitt Peak || Spacewatch ||  || align=right | 2.2 km || 
|-id=644 bgcolor=#d6d6d6
| 570644 ||  || — || October 2, 2006 || Kitt Peak || Spacewatch ||  || align=right | 2.5 km || 
|-id=645 bgcolor=#d6d6d6
| 570645 ||  || — || October 19, 2006 || Kitt Peak || Spacewatch ||  || align=right | 2.4 km || 
|-id=646 bgcolor=#E9E9E9
| 570646 ||  || — || October 19, 2006 || Kitt Peak || Spacewatch ||  || align=right | 1.8 km || 
|-id=647 bgcolor=#fefefe
| 570647 ||  || — || October 3, 2006 || Mount Lemmon || Mount Lemmon Survey ||  || align=right data-sort-value="0.89" | 890 m || 
|-id=648 bgcolor=#d6d6d6
| 570648 ||  || — || October 19, 2006 || Kitt Peak || Spacewatch ||  || align=right | 2.3 km || 
|-id=649 bgcolor=#d6d6d6
| 570649 ||  || — || October 19, 2006 || Kitt Peak || Spacewatch ||  || align=right | 2.4 km || 
|-id=650 bgcolor=#d6d6d6
| 570650 ||  || — || October 19, 2006 || Kitt Peak || Spacewatch ||  || align=right | 2.6 km || 
|-id=651 bgcolor=#E9E9E9
| 570651 ||  || — || October 19, 2006 || Kitt Peak || Spacewatch ||  || align=right data-sort-value="0.90" | 900 m || 
|-id=652 bgcolor=#d6d6d6
| 570652 ||  || — || October 2, 2006 || Mount Lemmon || Mount Lemmon Survey ||  || align=right | 2.5 km || 
|-id=653 bgcolor=#d6d6d6
| 570653 ||  || — || October 19, 2006 || Kitt Peak || Spacewatch ||  || align=right | 2.8 km || 
|-id=654 bgcolor=#d6d6d6
| 570654 ||  || — || October 19, 2006 || Kitt Peak || Spacewatch ||  || align=right | 3.5 km || 
|-id=655 bgcolor=#d6d6d6
| 570655 ||  || — || October 19, 2006 || Mount Lemmon || Mount Lemmon Survey || EOS || align=right | 1.7 km || 
|-id=656 bgcolor=#d6d6d6
| 570656 ||  || — || October 20, 2006 || Kitt Peak || Spacewatch ||  || align=right | 2.8 km || 
|-id=657 bgcolor=#d6d6d6
| 570657 ||  || — || October 20, 2006 || Mount Lemmon || Mount Lemmon Survey ||  || align=right | 2.0 km || 
|-id=658 bgcolor=#d6d6d6
| 570658 ||  || — || October 20, 2006 || Mount Lemmon || Mount Lemmon Survey ||  || align=right | 2.4 km || 
|-id=659 bgcolor=#d6d6d6
| 570659 ||  || — || October 21, 2006 || Kitt Peak || Spacewatch ||  || align=right | 2.9 km || 
|-id=660 bgcolor=#d6d6d6
| 570660 ||  || — || September 27, 2006 || Mount Lemmon || Mount Lemmon Survey ||  || align=right | 2.0 km || 
|-id=661 bgcolor=#fefefe
| 570661 ||  || — || October 21, 2006 || Mount Lemmon || Mount Lemmon Survey ||  || align=right data-sort-value="0.69" | 690 m || 
|-id=662 bgcolor=#d6d6d6
| 570662 ||  || — || October 21, 2006 || Mount Lemmon || Mount Lemmon Survey ||  || align=right | 2.0 km || 
|-id=663 bgcolor=#d6d6d6
| 570663 ||  || — || October 21, 2006 || Mount Lemmon || Mount Lemmon Survey ||  || align=right | 2.3 km || 
|-id=664 bgcolor=#d6d6d6
| 570664 ||  || — || October 21, 2006 || Mount Lemmon || Mount Lemmon Survey ||  || align=right | 2.4 km || 
|-id=665 bgcolor=#d6d6d6
| 570665 ||  || — || October 3, 2006 || Mount Lemmon || Mount Lemmon Survey ||  || align=right | 2.8 km || 
|-id=666 bgcolor=#d6d6d6
| 570666 ||  || — || September 27, 2006 || Kitt Peak || Spacewatch ||  || align=right | 2.7 km || 
|-id=667 bgcolor=#d6d6d6
| 570667 ||  || — || October 16, 2006 || Catalina || CSS ||  || align=right | 3.0 km || 
|-id=668 bgcolor=#d6d6d6
| 570668 ||  || — || October 19, 2006 || Catalina || CSS ||  || align=right | 2.9 km || 
|-id=669 bgcolor=#d6d6d6
| 570669 ||  || — || October 12, 2006 || Kitt Peak || Spacewatch || EOS || align=right | 1.5 km || 
|-id=670 bgcolor=#d6d6d6
| 570670 ||  || — || September 27, 2006 || Mount Lemmon || Mount Lemmon Survey || 3:2 || align=right | 4.6 km || 
|-id=671 bgcolor=#fefefe
| 570671 ||  || — || September 24, 2006 || Kitt Peak || Spacewatch ||  || align=right data-sort-value="0.73" | 730 m || 
|-id=672 bgcolor=#d6d6d6
| 570672 ||  || — || September 26, 2006 || Catalina || CSS || Tj (2.95) || align=right | 4.5 km || 
|-id=673 bgcolor=#d6d6d6
| 570673 ||  || — || October 23, 2006 || Kitt Peak || Spacewatch ||  || align=right | 2.0 km || 
|-id=674 bgcolor=#d6d6d6
| 570674 ||  || — || October 23, 2006 || Kitt Peak || Spacewatch ||  || align=right | 2.0 km || 
|-id=675 bgcolor=#d6d6d6
| 570675 ||  || — || September 30, 2006 || Mount Lemmon || Mount Lemmon Survey ||  || align=right | 1.8 km || 
|-id=676 bgcolor=#d6d6d6
| 570676 ||  || — || October 23, 2006 || Kitt Peak || Spacewatch ||  || align=right | 2.8 km || 
|-id=677 bgcolor=#d6d6d6
| 570677 ||  || — || October 19, 2006 || Mount Lemmon || Mount Lemmon Survey ||  || align=right | 3.5 km || 
|-id=678 bgcolor=#d6d6d6
| 570678 ||  || — || October 23, 2006 || Mount Lemmon || Mount Lemmon Survey ||  || align=right | 3.3 km || 
|-id=679 bgcolor=#d6d6d6
| 570679 ||  || — || October 2, 2006 || Mount Lemmon || Mount Lemmon Survey ||  || align=right | 2.2 km || 
|-id=680 bgcolor=#fefefe
| 570680 ||  || — || September 26, 2006 || Catalina || CSS ||  || align=right data-sort-value="0.94" | 940 m || 
|-id=681 bgcolor=#E9E9E9
| 570681 ||  || — || October 22, 2006 || Palomar || NEAT ||  || align=right | 1.1 km || 
|-id=682 bgcolor=#fefefe
| 570682 ||  || — || September 19, 2006 || Kitt Peak || Spacewatch ||  || align=right data-sort-value="0.78" | 780 m || 
|-id=683 bgcolor=#d6d6d6
| 570683 ||  || — || May 13, 2004 || Kitt Peak || Spacewatch ||  || align=right | 2.9 km || 
|-id=684 bgcolor=#d6d6d6
| 570684 ||  || — || October 23, 2006 || Kitt Peak || Spacewatch ||  || align=right | 2.5 km || 
|-id=685 bgcolor=#d6d6d6
| 570685 ||  || — || September 26, 2006 || Mount Lemmon || Mount Lemmon Survey || VER || align=right | 2.4 km || 
|-id=686 bgcolor=#d6d6d6
| 570686 ||  || — || October 27, 2006 || Kitt Peak || Spacewatch ||  || align=right | 2.5 km || 
|-id=687 bgcolor=#d6d6d6
| 570687 ||  || — || October 16, 2006 || Kitt Peak || Spacewatch ||  || align=right | 3.4 km || 
|-id=688 bgcolor=#E9E9E9
| 570688 ||  || — || October 13, 2006 || Kitt Peak || Spacewatch ||  || align=right data-sort-value="0.74" | 740 m || 
|-id=689 bgcolor=#d6d6d6
| 570689 ||  || — || October 19, 2006 || Kitt Peak || Spacewatch ||  || align=right | 2.5 km || 
|-id=690 bgcolor=#d6d6d6
| 570690 ||  || — || October 27, 2006 || Mount Lemmon || Mount Lemmon Survey ||  || align=right | 3.1 km || 
|-id=691 bgcolor=#fefefe
| 570691 ||  || — || September 18, 2006 || Kitt Peak || Spacewatch ||  || align=right data-sort-value="0.65" | 650 m || 
|-id=692 bgcolor=#d6d6d6
| 570692 ||  || — || September 26, 2006 || Mount Lemmon || Mount Lemmon Survey ||  || align=right | 2.4 km || 
|-id=693 bgcolor=#d6d6d6
| 570693 ||  || — || October 16, 2006 || Kitt Peak || Spacewatch ||  || align=right | 2.2 km || 
|-id=694 bgcolor=#d6d6d6
| 570694 ||  || — || October 28, 2006 || Mount Lemmon || Mount Lemmon Survey ||  || align=right | 2.5 km || 
|-id=695 bgcolor=#d6d6d6
| 570695 ||  || — || October 16, 2006 || Kitt Peak || Spacewatch ||  || align=right | 2.4 km || 
|-id=696 bgcolor=#E9E9E9
| 570696 ||  || — || October 31, 2006 || Kitt Peak || Spacewatch ||  || align=right | 1.0 km || 
|-id=697 bgcolor=#d6d6d6
| 570697 ||  || — || October 27, 2006 || Mount Lemmon || Mount Lemmon Survey ||  || align=right | 2.3 km || 
|-id=698 bgcolor=#d6d6d6
| 570698 ||  || — || October 21, 2006 || Mount Lemmon || Mount Lemmon Survey ||  || align=right | 2.8 km || 
|-id=699 bgcolor=#d6d6d6
| 570699 ||  || — || October 19, 2006 || Kitt Peak || L. H. Wasserman ||  || align=right | 1.7 km || 
|-id=700 bgcolor=#E9E9E9
| 570700 ||  || — || October 19, 2006 || Kitt Peak || L. H. Wasserman ||  || align=right | 1.9 km || 
|}

570701–570800 

|-bgcolor=#d6d6d6
| 570701 ||  || — || October 15, 2001 || Kitt Peak || Spacewatch ||  || align=right | 2.0 km || 
|-id=702 bgcolor=#d6d6d6
| 570702 ||  || — || October 19, 2006 || Kitt Peak || L. H. Wasserman ||  || align=right | 1.8 km || 
|-id=703 bgcolor=#fefefe
| 570703 ||  || — || October 19, 2006 || Kitt Peak || L. H. Wasserman ||  || align=right data-sort-value="0.71" | 710 m || 
|-id=704 bgcolor=#d6d6d6
| 570704 ||  || — || October 19, 2006 || Kitt Peak || L. H. Wasserman ||  || align=right | 2.0 km || 
|-id=705 bgcolor=#d6d6d6
| 570705 ||  || — || October 21, 2006 || Apache Point || SDSS Collaboration ||  || align=right | 1.9 km || 
|-id=706 bgcolor=#d6d6d6
| 570706 ||  || — || October 13, 2006 || Apache Point || SDSS Collaboration ||  || align=right | 2.8 km || 
|-id=707 bgcolor=#fefefe
| 570707 ||  || — || October 13, 2006 || Apache Point || SDSS Collaboration ||  || align=right data-sort-value="0.94" | 940 m || 
|-id=708 bgcolor=#d6d6d6
| 570708 ||  || — || September 28, 2006 || Kitt Peak || Spacewatch ||  || align=right | 2.3 km || 
|-id=709 bgcolor=#d6d6d6
| 570709 ||  || — || October 11, 2006 || Apache Point || SDSS Collaboration ||  || align=right | 2.3 km || 
|-id=710 bgcolor=#d6d6d6
| 570710 ||  || — || November 1, 2006 || Kitt Peak || Spacewatch ||  || align=right | 2.9 km || 
|-id=711 bgcolor=#d6d6d6
| 570711 ||  || — || October 20, 2006 || Kitt Peak || Spacewatch ||  || align=right | 1.9 km || 
|-id=712 bgcolor=#d6d6d6
| 570712 ||  || — || October 27, 2006 || Mount Lemmon || Mount Lemmon Survey ||  || align=right | 2.0 km || 
|-id=713 bgcolor=#d6d6d6
| 570713 ||  || — || November 1, 2006 || Kitt Peak || Spacewatch ||  || align=right | 2.0 km || 
|-id=714 bgcolor=#d6d6d6
| 570714 ||  || — || August 20, 2000 || Kitt Peak || Spacewatch ||  || align=right | 1.9 km || 
|-id=715 bgcolor=#fefefe
| 570715 ||  || — || October 21, 2006 || Kitt Peak || Spacewatch ||  || align=right data-sort-value="0.43" | 430 m || 
|-id=716 bgcolor=#d6d6d6
| 570716 ||  || — || October 28, 2006 || Catalina || CSS ||  || align=right | 3.2 km || 
|-id=717 bgcolor=#fefefe
| 570717 ||  || — || February 3, 2012 || Haleakala || Pan-STARRS ||  || align=right data-sort-value="0.76" | 760 m || 
|-id=718 bgcolor=#d6d6d6
| 570718 ||  || — || October 18, 2006 || Kitt Peak || Spacewatch ||  || align=right | 2.7 km || 
|-id=719 bgcolor=#d6d6d6
| 570719 ||  || — || October 23, 2012 || Mount Lemmon || Mount Lemmon Survey ||  || align=right | 3.1 km || 
|-id=720 bgcolor=#d6d6d6
| 570720 ||  || — || October 21, 2006 || Kitt Peak || Spacewatch ||  || align=right | 2.8 km || 
|-id=721 bgcolor=#d6d6d6
| 570721 ||  || — || October 23, 2006 || Kitt Peak || Spacewatch ||  || align=right | 2.4 km || 
|-id=722 bgcolor=#fefefe
| 570722 ||  || — || May 28, 2009 || Mount Lemmon || Mount Lemmon Survey ||  || align=right data-sort-value="0.62" | 620 m || 
|-id=723 bgcolor=#d6d6d6
| 570723 ||  || — || October 20, 2006 || Kitt Peak || L. H. Wasserman ||  || align=right | 2.4 km || 
|-id=724 bgcolor=#d6d6d6
| 570724 ||  || — || September 4, 2011 || Haleakala || Pan-STARRS ||  || align=right | 2.2 km || 
|-id=725 bgcolor=#d6d6d6
| 570725 ||  || — || February 28, 2014 || Haleakala || Pan-STARRS ||  || align=right | 2.5 km || 
|-id=726 bgcolor=#d6d6d6
| 570726 ||  || — || December 20, 2007 || Kitt Peak || Spacewatch ||  || align=right | 2.2 km || 
|-id=727 bgcolor=#d6d6d6
| 570727 ||  || — || October 19, 2006 || Mount Lemmon || Mount Lemmon Survey ||  || align=right | 2.5 km || 
|-id=728 bgcolor=#fefefe
| 570728 ||  || — || October 17, 2006 || Kitt Peak || Spacewatch ||  || align=right data-sort-value="0.57" | 570 m || 
|-id=729 bgcolor=#d6d6d6
| 570729 ||  || — || September 21, 2011 || Mount Lemmon || Mount Lemmon Survey ||  || align=right | 2.4 km || 
|-id=730 bgcolor=#d6d6d6
| 570730 ||  || — || October 20, 2006 || Kitt Peak || Spacewatch ||  || align=right | 2.9 km || 
|-id=731 bgcolor=#d6d6d6
| 570731 ||  || — || October 23, 2006 || Kitt Peak || Spacewatch ||  || align=right | 2.0 km || 
|-id=732 bgcolor=#d6d6d6
| 570732 ||  || — || August 25, 2011 || Haleakala || Haleakala-Faulkes ||  || align=right | 2.4 km || 
|-id=733 bgcolor=#d6d6d6
| 570733 ||  || — || September 26, 2011 || Haleakala || Pan-STARRS ||  || align=right | 2.2 km || 
|-id=734 bgcolor=#d6d6d6
| 570734 ||  || — || January 13, 2008 || Kitt Peak || Spacewatch ||  || align=right | 2.4 km || 
|-id=735 bgcolor=#d6d6d6
| 570735 ||  || — || October 16, 2006 || Kitt Peak || Spacewatch ||  || align=right | 2.4 km || 
|-id=736 bgcolor=#fefefe
| 570736 ||  || — || August 4, 2013 || Haleakala || Pan-STARRS ||  || align=right data-sort-value="0.58" | 580 m || 
|-id=737 bgcolor=#E9E9E9
| 570737 ||  || — || October 19, 2006 || Mount Lemmon || Mount Lemmon Survey ||  || align=right data-sort-value="0.82" | 820 m || 
|-id=738 bgcolor=#d6d6d6
| 570738 ||  || — || October 31, 2006 || Mount Lemmon || Mount Lemmon Survey || Tj (2.95) || align=right | 3.9 km || 
|-id=739 bgcolor=#d6d6d6
| 570739 ||  || — || October 27, 2006 || Mount Lemmon || Mount Lemmon Survey ||  || align=right | 2.8 km || 
|-id=740 bgcolor=#E9E9E9
| 570740 ||  || — || October 22, 2006 || Kitt Peak || Spacewatch || critical || align=right data-sort-value="0.62" | 620 m || 
|-id=741 bgcolor=#d6d6d6
| 570741 ||  || — || October 19, 2006 || Kitt Peak || Spacewatch ||  || align=right | 2.1 km || 
|-id=742 bgcolor=#d6d6d6
| 570742 ||  || — || October 31, 2006 || Kitt Peak || Spacewatch ||  || align=right | 2.2 km || 
|-id=743 bgcolor=#d6d6d6
| 570743 ||  || — || August 26, 2000 || Cerro Tololo || R. Millis, L. H. Wasserman ||  || align=right | 1.9 km || 
|-id=744 bgcolor=#d6d6d6
| 570744 ||  || — || October 22, 2006 || Kitt Peak || Spacewatch ||  || align=right | 2.0 km || 
|-id=745 bgcolor=#E9E9E9
| 570745 ||  || — || October 20, 2006 || Kitt Peak || Spacewatch ||  || align=right | 1.9 km || 
|-id=746 bgcolor=#d6d6d6
| 570746 ||  || — || October 27, 2006 || Mount Lemmon || Mount Lemmon Survey ||  || align=right | 2.4 km || 
|-id=747 bgcolor=#E9E9E9
| 570747 ||  || — || October 20, 2006 || Kitt Peak || Spacewatch ||  || align=right | 1.8 km || 
|-id=748 bgcolor=#d6d6d6
| 570748 ||  || — || November 11, 2006 || Kitt Peak || Spacewatch ||  || align=right | 2.2 km || 
|-id=749 bgcolor=#d6d6d6
| 570749 ||  || — || October 31, 2006 || Mount Lemmon || Mount Lemmon Survey ||  || align=right | 2.5 km || 
|-id=750 bgcolor=#d6d6d6
| 570750 ||  || — || October 31, 2006 || Mount Lemmon || Mount Lemmon Survey || (1298) || align=right | 2.3 km || 
|-id=751 bgcolor=#d6d6d6
| 570751 ||  || — || October 20, 2006 || Mount Lemmon || Mount Lemmon Survey ||  || align=right | 2.8 km || 
|-id=752 bgcolor=#d6d6d6
| 570752 ||  || — || November 11, 2006 || Mount Lemmon || Mount Lemmon Survey ||  || align=right | 2.8 km || 
|-id=753 bgcolor=#d6d6d6
| 570753 ||  || — || April 24, 2003 || Kitt Peak || Spacewatch ||  || align=right | 2.6 km || 
|-id=754 bgcolor=#d6d6d6
| 570754 ||  || — || November 12, 2006 || Mount Lemmon || Mount Lemmon Survey ||  || align=right | 2.3 km || 
|-id=755 bgcolor=#d6d6d6
| 570755 ||  || — || November 12, 2006 || Mount Lemmon || Mount Lemmon Survey ||  || align=right | 2.4 km || 
|-id=756 bgcolor=#d6d6d6
| 570756 ||  || — || November 12, 2006 || Mount Lemmon || Mount Lemmon Survey ||  || align=right | 2.5 km || 
|-id=757 bgcolor=#fefefe
| 570757 ||  || — || October 29, 2006 || Catalina || CSS || H || align=right data-sort-value="0.86" | 860 m || 
|-id=758 bgcolor=#d6d6d6
| 570758 ||  || — || August 20, 2000 || Kitt Peak || Spacewatch ||  || align=right | 2.5 km || 
|-id=759 bgcolor=#d6d6d6
| 570759 ||  || — || November 9, 2006 || Kitt Peak || Spacewatch ||  || align=right | 2.8 km || 
|-id=760 bgcolor=#d6d6d6
| 570760 ||  || — || October 19, 2006 || Mount Lemmon || Mount Lemmon Survey ||  || align=right | 2.6 km || 
|-id=761 bgcolor=#fefefe
| 570761 ||  || — || October 22, 2006 || Mount Lemmon || Mount Lemmon Survey ||  || align=right data-sort-value="0.89" | 890 m || 
|-id=762 bgcolor=#d6d6d6
| 570762 ||  || — || November 12, 2006 || Mount Lemmon || Mount Lemmon Survey ||  || align=right | 3.0 km || 
|-id=763 bgcolor=#fefefe
| 570763 ||  || — || November 12, 2006 || Mount Lemmon || Mount Lemmon Survey ||  || align=right data-sort-value="0.75" | 750 m || 
|-id=764 bgcolor=#d6d6d6
| 570764 ||  || — || October 27, 2006 || Mount Lemmon || Mount Lemmon Survey ||  || align=right | 2.4 km || 
|-id=765 bgcolor=#d6d6d6
| 570765 ||  || — || October 13, 2006 || Kitt Peak || Spacewatch ||  || align=right | 2.4 km || 
|-id=766 bgcolor=#d6d6d6
| 570766 ||  || — || October 19, 2006 || Mount Lemmon || Mount Lemmon Survey ||  || align=right | 1.9 km || 
|-id=767 bgcolor=#fefefe
| 570767 ||  || — || November 14, 2006 || Kitt Peak || Spacewatch || H || align=right data-sort-value="0.67" | 670 m || 
|-id=768 bgcolor=#d6d6d6
| 570768 ||  || — || October 28, 2006 || Mount Lemmon || Mount Lemmon Survey ||  || align=right | 2.3 km || 
|-id=769 bgcolor=#fefefe
| 570769 ||  || — || November 14, 2006 || Kitt Peak || Spacewatch ||  || align=right data-sort-value="0.49" | 490 m || 
|-id=770 bgcolor=#d6d6d6
| 570770 ||  || — || October 19, 2006 || Kitt Peak || Spacewatch ||  || align=right | 3.0 km || 
|-id=771 bgcolor=#E9E9E9
| 570771 ||  || — || November 10, 2006 || Kitt Peak || Spacewatch || HNS || align=right | 1.1 km || 
|-id=772 bgcolor=#E9E9E9
| 570772 ||  || — || November 11, 2006 || Kitt Peak || Spacewatch ||  || align=right data-sort-value="0.65" | 650 m || 
|-id=773 bgcolor=#d6d6d6
| 570773 ||  || — || October 20, 2006 || Kitt Peak || Spacewatch ||  || align=right | 2.5 km || 
|-id=774 bgcolor=#d6d6d6
| 570774 ||  || — || October 22, 2006 || Mount Lemmon || Mount Lemmon Survey ||  || align=right | 2.9 km || 
|-id=775 bgcolor=#d6d6d6
| 570775 ||  || — || November 12, 2006 || Lulin || LUSS ||  || align=right | 1.8 km || 
|-id=776 bgcolor=#d6d6d6
| 570776 ||  || — || October 20, 2006 || Mount Lemmon || Mount Lemmon Survey ||  || align=right | 3.1 km || 
|-id=777 bgcolor=#d6d6d6
| 570777 ||  || — || November 14, 2006 || Mount Lemmon || Mount Lemmon Survey ||  || align=right | 3.1 km || 
|-id=778 bgcolor=#E9E9E9
| 570778 ||  || — || October 23, 2006 || Kitt Peak || Spacewatch ||  || align=right | 1.1 km || 
|-id=779 bgcolor=#fefefe
| 570779 ||  || — || September 28, 2006 || Mount Lemmon || Mount Lemmon Survey ||  || align=right data-sort-value="0.62" | 620 m || 
|-id=780 bgcolor=#d6d6d6
| 570780 ||  || — || November 14, 2006 || Kitt Peak || Spacewatch ||  || align=right | 3.4 km || 
|-id=781 bgcolor=#d6d6d6
| 570781 ||  || — || October 20, 2006 || Mount Lemmon || Mount Lemmon Survey ||  || align=right | 2.2 km || 
|-id=782 bgcolor=#d6d6d6
| 570782 ||  || — || November 15, 2006 || Kitt Peak || Spacewatch ||  || align=right | 2.3 km || 
|-id=783 bgcolor=#E9E9E9
| 570783 ||  || — || November 15, 2006 || Kitt Peak || Spacewatch ||  || align=right | 1.1 km || 
|-id=784 bgcolor=#d6d6d6
| 570784 ||  || — || November 15, 2006 || Kitt Peak || Spacewatch ||  || align=right | 2.7 km || 
|-id=785 bgcolor=#E9E9E9
| 570785 ||  || — || November 15, 2006 || Mount Lemmon || Mount Lemmon Survey ||  || align=right | 1.1 km || 
|-id=786 bgcolor=#E9E9E9
| 570786 ||  || — || October 20, 2006 || Mount Lemmon || Mount Lemmon Survey ||  || align=right data-sort-value="0.86" | 860 m || 
|-id=787 bgcolor=#d6d6d6
| 570787 ||  || — || November 15, 2006 || Kitt Peak || Spacewatch ||  || align=right | 2.0 km || 
|-id=788 bgcolor=#fefefe
| 570788 ||  || — || November 15, 2006 || Mount Lemmon || Mount Lemmon Survey || H || align=right data-sort-value="0.64" | 640 m || 
|-id=789 bgcolor=#d6d6d6
| 570789 ||  || — || August 6, 2005 || Palomar || NEAT || 3:2 || align=right | 4.5 km || 
|-id=790 bgcolor=#fefefe
| 570790 ||  || — || November 11, 2006 || Catalina || CSS ||  || align=right data-sort-value="0.65" | 650 m || 
|-id=791 bgcolor=#E9E9E9
| 570791 ||  || — || November 1, 2006 || Kitt Peak || Spacewatch ||  || align=right data-sort-value="0.78" | 780 m || 
|-id=792 bgcolor=#d6d6d6
| 570792 ||  || — || November 1, 2006 || Kitt Peak || Spacewatch ||  || align=right | 2.2 km || 
|-id=793 bgcolor=#d6d6d6
| 570793 ||  || — || November 1, 2006 || Mount Lemmon || Mount Lemmon Survey ||  || align=right | 1.9 km || 
|-id=794 bgcolor=#d6d6d6
| 570794 ||  || — || November 1, 2006 || Mount Lemmon || Mount Lemmon Survey ||  || align=right | 2.2 km || 
|-id=795 bgcolor=#d6d6d6
| 570795 ||  || — || November 13, 2006 || Kitt Peak || Spacewatch ||  || align=right | 3.4 km || 
|-id=796 bgcolor=#d6d6d6
| 570796 ||  || — || November 1, 2006 || Kitt Peak || Spacewatch ||  || align=right | 2.7 km || 
|-id=797 bgcolor=#d6d6d6
| 570797 ||  || — || November 14, 2006 || Mount Lemmon || Mount Lemmon Survey ||  || align=right | 2.8 km || 
|-id=798 bgcolor=#d6d6d6
| 570798 ||  || — || November 1, 2006 || Kitt Peak || Spacewatch ||  || align=right | 2.7 km || 
|-id=799 bgcolor=#d6d6d6
| 570799 ||  || — || October 20, 2017 || Mount Lemmon || Mount Lemmon Survey ||  || align=right | 2.8 km || 
|-id=800 bgcolor=#d6d6d6
| 570800 ||  || — || November 11, 2006 || Kitt Peak || Spacewatch ||  || align=right | 2.4 km || 
|}

570801–570900 

|-bgcolor=#d6d6d6
| 570801 ||  || — || September 28, 2011 || Kitt Peak || Spacewatch ||  || align=right | 2.4 km || 
|-id=802 bgcolor=#E9E9E9
| 570802 ||  || — || October 19, 2010 || Mount Lemmon || Mount Lemmon Survey ||  || align=right data-sort-value="0.71" | 710 m || 
|-id=803 bgcolor=#d6d6d6
| 570803 ||  || — || March 17, 2015 || Haleakala || Pan-STARRS ||  || align=right | 2.5 km || 
|-id=804 bgcolor=#d6d6d6
| 570804 ||  || — || April 2, 2009 || Mount Lemmon || Mount Lemmon Survey ||  || align=right | 3.0 km || 
|-id=805 bgcolor=#E9E9E9
| 570805 ||  || — || November 23, 2014 || Mount Lemmon || Mount Lemmon Survey ||  || align=right | 1.3 km || 
|-id=806 bgcolor=#d6d6d6
| 570806 ||  || — || November 11, 2006 || Mount Lemmon || Mount Lemmon Survey ||  || align=right | 2.6 km || 
|-id=807 bgcolor=#E9E9E9
| 570807 ||  || — || September 26, 2014 || Mount Lemmon || Mount Lemmon Survey ||  || align=right data-sort-value="0.98" | 980 m || 
|-id=808 bgcolor=#d6d6d6
| 570808 ||  || — || October 31, 2006 || Kitt Peak || Spacewatch ||  || align=right | 2.1 km || 
|-id=809 bgcolor=#d6d6d6
| 570809 ||  || — || July 11, 2016 || Haleakala || Pan-STARRS ||  || align=right | 2.4 km || 
|-id=810 bgcolor=#d6d6d6
| 570810 ||  || — || November 14, 2006 || Kitt Peak || Spacewatch ||  || align=right | 2.5 km || 
|-id=811 bgcolor=#fefefe
| 570811 ||  || — || September 10, 2013 || Haleakala || Pan-STARRS ||  || align=right data-sort-value="0.75" | 750 m || 
|-id=812 bgcolor=#d6d6d6
| 570812 ||  || — || November 12, 2006 || Mount Lemmon || Mount Lemmon Survey ||  || align=right | 2.3 km || 
|-id=813 bgcolor=#fefefe
| 570813 ||  || — || October 20, 2006 || Mount Lemmon || Mount Lemmon Survey || H || align=right data-sort-value="0.76" | 760 m || 
|-id=814 bgcolor=#fefefe
| 570814 Nauru ||  ||  || November 18, 2006 || Nogales || J.-C. Merlin ||  || align=right data-sort-value="0.62" | 620 m || 
|-id=815 bgcolor=#fefefe
| 570815 ||  || — || November 16, 2006 || Mount Lemmon || Mount Lemmon Survey || H || align=right data-sort-value="0.68" | 680 m || 
|-id=816 bgcolor=#d6d6d6
| 570816 ||  || — || November 20, 2006 || 7300 || W. K. Y. Yeung ||  || align=right | 2.0 km || 
|-id=817 bgcolor=#d6d6d6
| 570817 ||  || — || November 16, 2006 || Kitt Peak || Spacewatch ||  || align=right | 1.9 km || 
|-id=818 bgcolor=#d6d6d6
| 570818 ||  || — || November 16, 2006 || Kitt Peak || Spacewatch ||  || align=right | 2.9 km || 
|-id=819 bgcolor=#fefefe
| 570819 ||  || — || October 28, 1998 || Kitt Peak || Spacewatch ||  || align=right data-sort-value="0.84" | 840 m || 
|-id=820 bgcolor=#d6d6d6
| 570820 ||  || — || October 20, 2006 || Mount Lemmon || Mount Lemmon Survey ||  || align=right | 2.1 km || 
|-id=821 bgcolor=#d6d6d6
| 570821 ||  || — || November 17, 2006 || Kitt Peak || Spacewatch ||  || align=right | 2.5 km || 
|-id=822 bgcolor=#d6d6d6
| 570822 ||  || — || November 17, 2006 || Mount Lemmon || Mount Lemmon Survey ||  || align=right | 2.4 km || 
|-id=823 bgcolor=#d6d6d6
| 570823 ||  || — || October 22, 2006 || Kitt Peak || Spacewatch ||  || align=right | 2.2 km || 
|-id=824 bgcolor=#d6d6d6
| 570824 ||  || — || November 17, 2006 || Mount Lemmon || Mount Lemmon Survey ||  || align=right | 2.9 km || 
|-id=825 bgcolor=#fefefe
| 570825 ||  || — || November 1, 2006 || Mount Lemmon || Mount Lemmon Survey || H || align=right data-sort-value="0.58" | 580 m || 
|-id=826 bgcolor=#d6d6d6
| 570826 ||  || — || November 16, 2006 || Kitt Peak || Spacewatch ||  || align=right | 2.1 km || 
|-id=827 bgcolor=#d6d6d6
| 570827 ||  || — || November 12, 2006 || Mount Lemmon || Mount Lemmon Survey ||  || align=right | 2.8 km || 
|-id=828 bgcolor=#d6d6d6
| 570828 ||  || — || November 16, 2006 || Kitt Peak || Spacewatch ||  || align=right | 3.0 km || 
|-id=829 bgcolor=#d6d6d6
| 570829 ||  || — || November 16, 2006 || Kitt Peak || Spacewatch ||  || align=right | 2.7 km || 
|-id=830 bgcolor=#d6d6d6
| 570830 ||  || — || October 19, 2006 || Mount Lemmon || Mount Lemmon Survey ||  || align=right | 2.3 km || 
|-id=831 bgcolor=#fefefe
| 570831 ||  || — || November 16, 2006 || Kitt Peak || Spacewatch ||  || align=right data-sort-value="0.82" | 820 m || 
|-id=832 bgcolor=#E9E9E9
| 570832 ||  || — || November 16, 2006 || Kitt Peak || Spacewatch ||  || align=right | 1.3 km || 
|-id=833 bgcolor=#E9E9E9
| 570833 ||  || — || November 16, 2006 || Mount Lemmon || Mount Lemmon Survey ||  || align=right data-sort-value="0.85" | 850 m || 
|-id=834 bgcolor=#d6d6d6
| 570834 ||  || — || November 16, 2006 || Mount Lemmon || Mount Lemmon Survey ||  || align=right | 2.6 km || 
|-id=835 bgcolor=#fefefe
| 570835 ||  || — || May 10, 2005 || Cerro Tololo || M. W. Buie, L. H. Wasserman || NYS || align=right data-sort-value="0.63" | 630 m || 
|-id=836 bgcolor=#d6d6d6
| 570836 ||  || — || March 24, 2003 || Kitt Peak || Spacewatch ||  || align=right | 3.3 km || 
|-id=837 bgcolor=#d6d6d6
| 570837 ||  || — || November 16, 2006 || Kitt Peak || Spacewatch ||  || align=right | 2.6 km || 
|-id=838 bgcolor=#d6d6d6
| 570838 ||  || — || November 17, 2006 || Kitt Peak || Spacewatch ||  || align=right | 3.1 km || 
|-id=839 bgcolor=#fefefe
| 570839 ||  || — || November 17, 2006 || Mount Lemmon || Mount Lemmon Survey ||  || align=right data-sort-value="0.68" | 680 m || 
|-id=840 bgcolor=#fefefe
| 570840 ||  || — || November 17, 2006 || Mount Lemmon || Mount Lemmon Survey ||  || align=right data-sort-value="0.49" | 490 m || 
|-id=841 bgcolor=#fefefe
| 570841 ||  || — || September 30, 2006 || Mount Lemmon || Mount Lemmon Survey ||  || align=right data-sort-value="0.59" | 590 m || 
|-id=842 bgcolor=#d6d6d6
| 570842 ||  || — || November 17, 2006 || Mount Lemmon || Mount Lemmon Survey ||  || align=right | 2.8 km || 
|-id=843 bgcolor=#d6d6d6
| 570843 ||  || — || November 17, 2006 || Mount Lemmon || Mount Lemmon Survey ||  || align=right | 3.1 km || 
|-id=844 bgcolor=#d6d6d6
| 570844 ||  || — || November 18, 2006 || Kitt Peak || Spacewatch ||  || align=right | 2.9 km || 
|-id=845 bgcolor=#E9E9E9
| 570845 ||  || — || October 27, 2006 || Mount Lemmon || Mount Lemmon Survey ||  || align=right data-sort-value="0.79" | 790 m || 
|-id=846 bgcolor=#d6d6d6
| 570846 ||  || — || November 18, 2006 || Kitt Peak || Spacewatch ||  || align=right | 2.5 km || 
|-id=847 bgcolor=#d6d6d6
| 570847 ||  || — || November 18, 2006 || Kitt Peak || Spacewatch ||  || align=right | 2.5 km || 
|-id=848 bgcolor=#d6d6d6
| 570848 ||  || — || November 18, 2006 || Mount Lemmon || Mount Lemmon Survey ||  || align=right | 2.9 km || 
|-id=849 bgcolor=#d6d6d6
| 570849 ||  || — || November 18, 2006 || Kitt Peak || Spacewatch ||  || align=right | 3.5 km || 
|-id=850 bgcolor=#E9E9E9
| 570850 ||  || — || November 19, 2006 || Kitt Peak || Spacewatch ||  || align=right data-sort-value="0.94" | 940 m || 
|-id=851 bgcolor=#d6d6d6
| 570851 ||  || — || November 19, 2006 || Kitt Peak || Spacewatch ||  || align=right | 2.0 km || 
|-id=852 bgcolor=#d6d6d6
| 570852 ||  || — || November 19, 2006 || Kitt Peak || Spacewatch ||  || align=right | 2.4 km || 
|-id=853 bgcolor=#d6d6d6
| 570853 ||  || — || November 19, 2006 || Kitt Peak || Spacewatch ||  || align=right | 2.5 km || 
|-id=854 bgcolor=#d6d6d6
| 570854 ||  || — || November 19, 2006 || Kitt Peak || Spacewatch ||  || align=right | 2.9 km || 
|-id=855 bgcolor=#FA8072
| 570855 ||  || — || July 16, 2002 || Haleakala || AMOS ||  || align=right data-sort-value="0.84" | 840 m || 
|-id=856 bgcolor=#d6d6d6
| 570856 ||  || — || November 19, 2006 || Kitt Peak || Spacewatch ||  || align=right | 3.0 km || 
|-id=857 bgcolor=#E9E9E9
| 570857 ||  || — || November 20, 2006 || Mount Lemmon || Mount Lemmon Survey ||  || align=right | 1.9 km || 
|-id=858 bgcolor=#d6d6d6
| 570858 ||  || — || October 20, 2006 || Mount Lemmon || Mount Lemmon Survey ||  || align=right | 1.9 km || 
|-id=859 bgcolor=#E9E9E9
| 570859 ||  || — || November 21, 2006 || Mount Lemmon || Mount Lemmon Survey ||  || align=right | 1.2 km || 
|-id=860 bgcolor=#d6d6d6
| 570860 ||  || — || November 21, 2006 || Mount Lemmon || Mount Lemmon Survey ||  || align=right | 2.3 km || 
|-id=861 bgcolor=#d6d6d6
| 570861 ||  || — || November 22, 2006 || Mount Lemmon || Mount Lemmon Survey ||  || align=right | 2.6 km || 
|-id=862 bgcolor=#d6d6d6
| 570862 ||  || — || November 22, 2006 || Mount Lemmon || Mount Lemmon Survey ||  || align=right | 2.5 km || 
|-id=863 bgcolor=#d6d6d6
| 570863 ||  || — || September 28, 2006 || Apache Point || SDSS Collaboration ||  || align=right | 2.4 km || 
|-id=864 bgcolor=#d6d6d6
| 570864 ||  || — || October 19, 2006 || Mount Lemmon || Mount Lemmon Survey ||  || align=right | 2.5 km || 
|-id=865 bgcolor=#d6d6d6
| 570865 ||  || — || November 18, 2006 || Mount Lemmon || Mount Lemmon Survey ||  || align=right | 2.4 km || 
|-id=866 bgcolor=#fefefe
| 570866 ||  || — || November 19, 2006 || Kitt Peak || Spacewatch || H || align=right data-sort-value="0.76" | 760 m || 
|-id=867 bgcolor=#d6d6d6
| 570867 ||  || — || November 20, 2006 || Kitt Peak || Spacewatch ||  || align=right | 2.8 km || 
|-id=868 bgcolor=#d6d6d6
| 570868 ||  || — || October 31, 2006 || Mount Lemmon || Mount Lemmon Survey ||  || align=right | 2.2 km || 
|-id=869 bgcolor=#d6d6d6
| 570869 ||  || — || November 20, 2006 || Kitt Peak || Spacewatch ||  || align=right | 2.3 km || 
|-id=870 bgcolor=#d6d6d6
| 570870 ||  || — || November 20, 2006 || Mount Lemmon || Mount Lemmon Survey ||  || align=right | 3.1 km || 
|-id=871 bgcolor=#d6d6d6
| 570871 ||  || — || November 16, 2006 || Kitt Peak || Spacewatch ||  || align=right | 2.9 km || 
|-id=872 bgcolor=#E9E9E9
| 570872 ||  || — || November 22, 2006 || Kitt Peak || Spacewatch ||  || align=right | 1.4 km || 
|-id=873 bgcolor=#d6d6d6
| 570873 ||  || — || November 22, 2006 || Kitt Peak || Spacewatch ||  || align=right | 1.9 km || 
|-id=874 bgcolor=#fefefe
| 570874 ||  || — || November 22, 2006 || Mount Lemmon || Mount Lemmon Survey ||  || align=right data-sort-value="0.82" | 820 m || 
|-id=875 bgcolor=#E9E9E9
| 570875 ||  || — || November 22, 2006 || Kitt Peak || Spacewatch ||  || align=right data-sort-value="0.98" | 980 m || 
|-id=876 bgcolor=#d6d6d6
| 570876 ||  || — || September 28, 2006 || Mount Lemmon || Mount Lemmon Survey ||  || align=right | 2.5 km || 
|-id=877 bgcolor=#fefefe
| 570877 ||  || — || October 31, 2006 || Mount Lemmon || Mount Lemmon Survey ||  || align=right data-sort-value="0.54" | 540 m || 
|-id=878 bgcolor=#d6d6d6
| 570878 ||  || — || November 11, 2006 || Kitt Peak || Spacewatch || EOS || align=right | 1.9 km || 
|-id=879 bgcolor=#d6d6d6
| 570879 ||  || — || November 23, 2006 || Kitt Peak || Spacewatch ||  || align=right | 2.8 km || 
|-id=880 bgcolor=#fefefe
| 570880 ||  || — || November 23, 2006 || Kitt Peak || Spacewatch ||  || align=right data-sort-value="0.71" | 710 m || 
|-id=881 bgcolor=#d6d6d6
| 570881 ||  || — || November 23, 2006 || Mount Lemmon || Mount Lemmon Survey ||  || align=right | 3.4 km || 
|-id=882 bgcolor=#d6d6d6
| 570882 ||  || — || November 24, 2006 || Mount Lemmon || Mount Lemmon Survey ||  || align=right | 3.1 km || 
|-id=883 bgcolor=#d6d6d6
| 570883 ||  || — || October 21, 2006 || Lulin || LUSS || EOS || align=right | 2.4 km || 
|-id=884 bgcolor=#d6d6d6
| 570884 ||  || — || June 17, 2005 || Mount Lemmon || Mount Lemmon Survey ||  || align=right | 3.3 km || 
|-id=885 bgcolor=#d6d6d6
| 570885 ||  || — || November 27, 2006 || Kitt Peak || Spacewatch ||  || align=right | 2.4 km || 
|-id=886 bgcolor=#fefefe
| 570886 ||  || — || March 12, 2004 || Palomar || NEAT ||  || align=right data-sort-value="0.61" | 610 m || 
|-id=887 bgcolor=#fefefe
| 570887 ||  || — || February 14, 2012 || Haleakala || Pan-STARRS ||  || align=right data-sort-value="0.81" | 810 m || 
|-id=888 bgcolor=#fefefe
| 570888 ||  || — || November 22, 2006 || Kitt Peak || Spacewatch || H || align=right data-sort-value="0.58" | 580 m || 
|-id=889 bgcolor=#fefefe
| 570889 ||  || — || November 23, 2006 || Catalina || CSS ||  || align=right data-sort-value="0.75" | 750 m || 
|-id=890 bgcolor=#d6d6d6
| 570890 ||  || — || December 31, 2007 || Mount Lemmon || Mount Lemmon Survey ||  || align=right | 2.5 km || 
|-id=891 bgcolor=#d6d6d6
| 570891 ||  || — || September 26, 2011 || Mount Lemmon || Mount Lemmon Survey ||  || align=right | 2.8 km || 
|-id=892 bgcolor=#d6d6d6
| 570892 ||  || — || November 18, 2006 || Kitt Peak || Spacewatch ||  || align=right | 2.2 km || 
|-id=893 bgcolor=#d6d6d6
| 570893 ||  || — || October 24, 2011 || Haleakala || Pan-STARRS ||  || align=right | 2.6 km || 
|-id=894 bgcolor=#E9E9E9
| 570894 ||  || — || February 12, 2016 || Haleakala || Pan-STARRS ||  || align=right | 1.3 km || 
|-id=895 bgcolor=#d6d6d6
| 570895 ||  || — || April 23, 2015 || Haleakala || Pan-STARRS ||  || align=right | 2.7 km || 
|-id=896 bgcolor=#fefefe
| 570896 ||  || — || October 29, 2010 || Mount Lemmon || Mount Lemmon Survey ||  || align=right data-sort-value="0.86" | 860 m || 
|-id=897 bgcolor=#d6d6d6
| 570897 ||  || — || October 20, 2012 || Mount Lemmon || Mount Lemmon Survey ||  || align=right | 3.3 km || 
|-id=898 bgcolor=#d6d6d6
| 570898 ||  || — || August 10, 2016 || Haleakala || Pan-STARRS ||  || align=right | 3.0 km || 
|-id=899 bgcolor=#d6d6d6
| 570899 ||  || — || September 26, 2006 || Mount Lemmon || Mount Lemmon Survey ||  || align=right | 2.5 km || 
|-id=900 bgcolor=#d6d6d6
| 570900 ||  || — || November 22, 2006 || Kitt Peak || Spacewatch ||  || align=right | 2.4 km || 
|}

570901–571000 

|-bgcolor=#d6d6d6
| 570901 ||  || — || September 8, 2016 || Haleakala || Pan-STARRS ||  || align=right | 2.4 km || 
|-id=902 bgcolor=#d6d6d6
| 570902 ||  || — || June 8, 2016 || Haleakala || Pan-STARRS ||  || align=right | 2.4 km || 
|-id=903 bgcolor=#d6d6d6
| 570903 ||  || — || October 31, 2011 || Mount Lemmon || Mount Lemmon Survey ||  || align=right | 2.7 km || 
|-id=904 bgcolor=#E9E9E9
| 570904 ||  || — || October 30, 2010 || Mount Lemmon || Mount Lemmon Survey ||  || align=right data-sort-value="0.86" | 860 m || 
|-id=905 bgcolor=#d6d6d6
| 570905 ||  || — || November 19, 2006 || Kitt Peak || Spacewatch ||  || align=right | 2.8 km || 
|-id=906 bgcolor=#d6d6d6
| 570906 ||  || — || September 19, 2011 || Haleakala || Pan-STARRS ||  || align=right | 2.2 km || 
|-id=907 bgcolor=#d6d6d6
| 570907 ||  || — || September 25, 1995 || Kitt Peak || Spacewatch ||  || align=right | 2.1 km || 
|-id=908 bgcolor=#d6d6d6
| 570908 ||  || — || June 19, 2015 || Mount Lemmon || Mount Lemmon Survey ||  || align=right | 2.5 km || 
|-id=909 bgcolor=#d6d6d6
| 570909 ||  || — || November 17, 2006 || Kitt Peak || Spacewatch ||  || align=right | 2.3 km || 
|-id=910 bgcolor=#d6d6d6
| 570910 ||  || — || March 4, 2008 || Catalina || CSS ||  || align=right | 3.1 km || 
|-id=911 bgcolor=#d6d6d6
| 570911 ||  || — || September 26, 2011 || Haleakala || Pan-STARRS ||  || align=right | 1.8 km || 
|-id=912 bgcolor=#d6d6d6
| 570912 ||  || — || September 4, 2011 || Haleakala || Pan-STARRS ||  || align=right | 2.2 km || 
|-id=913 bgcolor=#d6d6d6
| 570913 ||  || — || November 23, 2006 || Kitt Peak || Spacewatch ||  || align=right | 2.6 km || 
|-id=914 bgcolor=#fefefe
| 570914 ||  || — || November 22, 2006 || Mount Lemmon || Mount Lemmon Survey || H || align=right data-sort-value="0.58" | 580 m || 
|-id=915 bgcolor=#d6d6d6
| 570915 ||  || — || February 28, 2014 || Mount Lemmon || Mount Lemmon Survey ||  || align=right | 2.9 km || 
|-id=916 bgcolor=#d6d6d6
| 570916 ||  || — || June 15, 2015 || Mount Lemmon || Mount Lemmon Survey ||  || align=right | 2.8 km || 
|-id=917 bgcolor=#d6d6d6
| 570917 ||  || — || November 16, 2006 || Kitt Peak || Spacewatch ||  || align=right | 2.2 km || 
|-id=918 bgcolor=#d6d6d6
| 570918 ||  || — || November 15, 2017 || Mount Lemmon || Mount Lemmon Survey ||  || align=right | 2.0 km || 
|-id=919 bgcolor=#d6d6d6
| 570919 ||  || — || January 27, 2017 || Haleakala || Pan-STARRS || 3:2 || align=right | 3.9 km || 
|-id=920 bgcolor=#d6d6d6
| 570920 ||  || — || November 25, 2006 || Kitt Peak || Spacewatch ||  || align=right | 3.3 km || 
|-id=921 bgcolor=#d6d6d6
| 570921 ||  || — || November 16, 1995 || Kitt Peak || Spacewatch ||  || align=right | 3.2 km || 
|-id=922 bgcolor=#d6d6d6
| 570922 ||  || — || June 13, 2015 || Haleakala || Pan-STARRS ||  || align=right | 2.9 km || 
|-id=923 bgcolor=#d6d6d6
| 570923 ||  || — || January 12, 2008 || Kitt Peak || Spacewatch ||  || align=right | 2.0 km || 
|-id=924 bgcolor=#d6d6d6
| 570924 ||  || — || November 24, 2006 || Kitt Peak || Spacewatch ||  || align=right | 2.1 km || 
|-id=925 bgcolor=#d6d6d6
| 570925 ||  || — || April 25, 2015 || Haleakala || Pan-STARRS ||  || align=right | 2.2 km || 
|-id=926 bgcolor=#d6d6d6
| 570926 ||  || — || November 27, 2006 || Kitt Peak || Spacewatch ||  || align=right | 2.0 km || 
|-id=927 bgcolor=#d6d6d6
| 570927 ||  || — || November 23, 2006 || Kitt Peak || Spacewatch ||  || align=right | 2.7 km || 
|-id=928 bgcolor=#d6d6d6
| 570928 ||  || — || November 22, 2006 || Kitt Peak || Spacewatch ||  || align=right | 2.8 km || 
|-id=929 bgcolor=#d6d6d6
| 570929 ||  || — || November 25, 2006 || Kitt Peak || Spacewatch ||  || align=right | 2.8 km || 
|-id=930 bgcolor=#d6d6d6
| 570930 ||  || — || November 17, 2006 || Mount Lemmon || Mount Lemmon Survey ||  || align=right | 2.6 km || 
|-id=931 bgcolor=#d6d6d6
| 570931 ||  || — || November 21, 2006 || Mount Lemmon || Mount Lemmon Survey ||  || align=right | 2.4 km || 
|-id=932 bgcolor=#d6d6d6
| 570932 ||  || — || November 22, 2006 || Kitt Peak || Spacewatch ||  || align=right | 1.8 km || 
|-id=933 bgcolor=#E9E9E9
| 570933 ||  || — || November 22, 2006 || Kitt Peak || Spacewatch ||  || align=right | 1.0 km || 
|-id=934 bgcolor=#E9E9E9
| 570934 ||  || — || December 9, 2006 || Kitt Peak || Spacewatch ||  || align=right | 1.0 km || 
|-id=935 bgcolor=#d6d6d6
| 570935 ||  || — || December 9, 2006 || Kitt Peak || Spacewatch ||  || align=right | 2.8 km || 
|-id=936 bgcolor=#d6d6d6
| 570936 ||  || — || December 9, 2006 || Kitt Peak || Spacewatch ||  || align=right | 2.9 km || 
|-id=937 bgcolor=#fefefe
| 570937 ||  || — || October 31, 2006 || Mount Lemmon || Mount Lemmon Survey ||  || align=right data-sort-value="0.57" | 570 m || 
|-id=938 bgcolor=#fefefe
| 570938 ||  || — || December 10, 2006 || Kitt Peak || Spacewatch ||  || align=right data-sort-value="0.82" | 820 m || 
|-id=939 bgcolor=#fefefe
| 570939 ||  || — || May 29, 2005 || Siding Spring || SSS ||  || align=right | 1.1 km || 
|-id=940 bgcolor=#d6d6d6
| 570940 ||  || — || December 12, 2006 || Mount Lemmon || Mount Lemmon Survey ||  || align=right | 2.6 km || 
|-id=941 bgcolor=#d6d6d6
| 570941 ||  || — || December 12, 2006 || Mount Lemmon || Mount Lemmon Survey ||  || align=right | 2.3 km || 
|-id=942 bgcolor=#fefefe
| 570942 ||  || — || November 16, 2006 || Lulin || LUSS || H || align=right data-sort-value="0.64" | 640 m || 
|-id=943 bgcolor=#d6d6d6
| 570943 ||  || — || December 13, 2006 || Kitt Peak || Spacewatch ||  || align=right | 2.9 km || 
|-id=944 bgcolor=#fefefe
| 570944 ||  || — || November 23, 2006 || Kitt Peak || Spacewatch ||  || align=right data-sort-value="0.93" | 930 m || 
|-id=945 bgcolor=#d6d6d6
| 570945 ||  || — || October 13, 2006 || Kitt Peak || Spacewatch ||  || align=right | 2.3 km || 
|-id=946 bgcolor=#fefefe
| 570946 ||  || — || December 11, 2006 || Kitt Peak || Spacewatch ||  || align=right | 1.2 km || 
|-id=947 bgcolor=#d6d6d6
| 570947 ||  || — || September 30, 2006 || Mount Lemmon || Mount Lemmon Survey ||  || align=right | 2.4 km || 
|-id=948 bgcolor=#E9E9E9
| 570948 ||  || — || November 17, 2006 || Kitt Peak || Spacewatch ||  || align=right | 1.2 km || 
|-id=949 bgcolor=#d6d6d6
| 570949 ||  || — || December 12, 2006 || Kitt Peak || Spacewatch ||  || align=right | 2.4 km || 
|-id=950 bgcolor=#FA8072
| 570950 ||  || — || November 22, 2006 || Kitt Peak || Spacewatch ||  || align=right data-sort-value="0.83" | 830 m || 
|-id=951 bgcolor=#fefefe
| 570951 ||  || — || December 12, 2006 || Mount Lemmon || Mount Lemmon Survey ||  || align=right data-sort-value="0.75" | 750 m || 
|-id=952 bgcolor=#d6d6d6
| 570952 ||  || — || December 12, 2006 || Mount Lemmon || Mount Lemmon Survey ||  || align=right | 2.7 km || 
|-id=953 bgcolor=#E9E9E9
| 570953 ||  || — || December 1, 2006 || Mount Lemmon || Mount Lemmon Survey ||  || align=right data-sort-value="0.83" | 830 m || 
|-id=954 bgcolor=#d6d6d6
| 570954 ||  || — || December 13, 2006 || Mount Lemmon || Mount Lemmon Survey ||  || align=right | 2.7 km || 
|-id=955 bgcolor=#d6d6d6
| 570955 ||  || — || August 27, 2005 || Palomar || NEAT ||  || align=right | 3.0 km || 
|-id=956 bgcolor=#d6d6d6
| 570956 ||  || — || August 25, 2004 || Kitt Peak || Spacewatch ||  || align=right | 3.3 km || 
|-id=957 bgcolor=#E9E9E9
| 570957 ||  || — || December 20, 2006 || Palomar || NEAT ||  || align=right | 1.0 km || 
|-id=958 bgcolor=#d6d6d6
| 570958 ||  || — || October 24, 2011 || Kitt Peak || Spacewatch ||  || align=right | 2.5 km || 
|-id=959 bgcolor=#d6d6d6
| 570959 ||  || — || December 11, 2006 || Kitt Peak || Spacewatch ||  || align=right | 2.8 km || 
|-id=960 bgcolor=#d6d6d6
| 570960 ||  || — || November 27, 2006 || Kitt Peak || Spacewatch ||  || align=right | 2.7 km || 
|-id=961 bgcolor=#d6d6d6
| 570961 ||  || — || October 31, 2006 || Kitt Peak || Spacewatch ||  || align=right | 2.5 km || 
|-id=962 bgcolor=#d6d6d6
| 570962 ||  || — || December 14, 2006 || Mount Lemmon || Mount Lemmon Survey ||  || align=right | 2.9 km || 
|-id=963 bgcolor=#d6d6d6
| 570963 ||  || — || November 25, 2006 || Kitt Peak || Spacewatch ||  || align=right | 2.9 km || 
|-id=964 bgcolor=#d6d6d6
| 570964 ||  || — || September 26, 2017 || Haleakala || Pan-STARRS ||  || align=right | 2.3 km || 
|-id=965 bgcolor=#d6d6d6
| 570965 ||  || — || January 20, 2013 || Kitt Peak || Spacewatch ||  || align=right | 3.1 km || 
|-id=966 bgcolor=#E9E9E9
| 570966 ||  || — || April 20, 2014 || Mount Lemmon || Mount Lemmon Survey ||  || align=right | 2.7 km || 
|-id=967 bgcolor=#E9E9E9
| 570967 ||  || — || November 19, 2006 || Kitt Peak || Spacewatch ||  || align=right data-sort-value="0.82" | 820 m || 
|-id=968 bgcolor=#d6d6d6
| 570968 ||  || — || December 9, 2006 || Kitt Peak || Spacewatch ||  || align=right | 2.9 km || 
|-id=969 bgcolor=#d6d6d6
| 570969 ||  || — || December 13, 2006 || Kitt Peak || Spacewatch ||  || align=right | 2.3 km || 
|-id=970 bgcolor=#d6d6d6
| 570970 ||  || — || December 10, 2006 || Kitt Peak || Spacewatch ||  || align=right | 2.6 km || 
|-id=971 bgcolor=#d6d6d6
| 570971 ||  || — || December 14, 2006 || Kitt Peak || Spacewatch ||  || align=right | 2.6 km || 
|-id=972 bgcolor=#d6d6d6
| 570972 ||  || — || December 1, 2006 || Mount Lemmon || Mount Lemmon Survey ||  || align=right | 2.5 km || 
|-id=973 bgcolor=#d6d6d6
| 570973 ||  || — || December 15, 2006 || Kitt Peak || Spacewatch ||  || align=right | 2.8 km || 
|-id=974 bgcolor=#d6d6d6
| 570974 ||  || — || December 15, 2006 || Kitt Peak || Spacewatch ||  || align=right | 2.2 km || 
|-id=975 bgcolor=#E9E9E9
| 570975 ||  || — || December 13, 2006 || Kitt Peak || Spacewatch ||  || align=right | 1.1 km || 
|-id=976 bgcolor=#E9E9E9
| 570976 ||  || — || December 16, 2006 || Mount Lemmon || Mount Lemmon Survey ||  || align=right data-sort-value="0.91" | 910 m || 
|-id=977 bgcolor=#d6d6d6
| 570977 ||  || — || November 12, 2006 || Mount Lemmon || Mount Lemmon Survey ||  || align=right | 3.2 km || 
|-id=978 bgcolor=#d6d6d6
| 570978 ||  || — || December 12, 2006 || Socorro || LINEAR ||  || align=right | 4.1 km || 
|-id=979 bgcolor=#d6d6d6
| 570979 ||  || — || December 20, 2006 || Mount Lemmon || Mount Lemmon Survey ||  || align=right | 2.0 km || 
|-id=980 bgcolor=#d6d6d6
| 570980 ||  || — || December 13, 2006 || Kitt Peak || Spacewatch ||  || align=right | 3.1 km || 
|-id=981 bgcolor=#d6d6d6
| 570981 ||  || — || December 12, 2006 || Mount Lemmon || Mount Lemmon Survey ||  || align=right | 2.7 km || 
|-id=982 bgcolor=#E9E9E9
| 570982 ||  || — || January 28, 2003 || Apache Point || SDSS Collaboration ||  || align=right | 1.1 km || 
|-id=983 bgcolor=#d6d6d6
| 570983 ||  || — || January 13, 1996 || Kitt Peak || Spacewatch ||  || align=right | 2.8 km || 
|-id=984 bgcolor=#E9E9E9
| 570984 ||  || — || December 21, 2006 || Kitt Peak || Spacewatch ||  || align=right data-sort-value="0.78" | 780 m || 
|-id=985 bgcolor=#d6d6d6
| 570985 ||  || — || December 21, 2006 || Kitt Peak || Spacewatch ||  || align=right | 3.5 km || 
|-id=986 bgcolor=#E9E9E9
| 570986 ||  || — || December 21, 2006 || Kitt Peak || Spacewatch ||  || align=right data-sort-value="0.76" | 760 m || 
|-id=987 bgcolor=#d6d6d6
| 570987 ||  || — || December 21, 2006 || Mount Lemmon || Mount Lemmon Survey ||  || align=right | 2.4 km || 
|-id=988 bgcolor=#d6d6d6
| 570988 ||  || — || December 21, 2006 || Kitt Peak || Spacewatch ||  || align=right | 2.9 km || 
|-id=989 bgcolor=#E9E9E9
| 570989 ||  || — || December 21, 2006 || Kitt Peak || Spacewatch ||  || align=right | 1.5 km || 
|-id=990 bgcolor=#d6d6d6
| 570990 ||  || — || December 21, 2006 || Kitt Peak || Spacewatch ||  || align=right | 2.3 km || 
|-id=991 bgcolor=#E9E9E9
| 570991 ||  || — || December 21, 2006 || Kitt Peak || Spacewatch ||  || align=right data-sort-value="0.91" | 910 m || 
|-id=992 bgcolor=#d6d6d6
| 570992 ||  || — || December 21, 2006 || Kitt Peak || Spacewatch ||  || align=right | 2.8 km || 
|-id=993 bgcolor=#E9E9E9
| 570993 ||  || — || November 22, 2006 || Kitt Peak || Spacewatch ||  || align=right | 1.2 km || 
|-id=994 bgcolor=#E9E9E9
| 570994 ||  || — || December 13, 2006 || Socorro || LINEAR ||  || align=right | 1.1 km || 
|-id=995 bgcolor=#E9E9E9
| 570995 ||  || — || December 14, 2006 || Kitt Peak || Spacewatch ||  || align=right | 1.3 km || 
|-id=996 bgcolor=#E9E9E9
| 570996 ||  || — || November 21, 2006 || Mount Lemmon || Mount Lemmon Survey ||  || align=right | 1.1 km || 
|-id=997 bgcolor=#d6d6d6
| 570997 ||  || — || December 25, 2006 || Kitt Peak || Spacewatch ||  || align=right | 2.8 km || 
|-id=998 bgcolor=#fefefe
| 570998 ||  || — || July 3, 2005 || Mount Lemmon || Mount Lemmon Survey ||  || align=right data-sort-value="0.65" | 650 m || 
|-id=999 bgcolor=#E9E9E9
| 570999 ||  || — || November 17, 2006 || Kitt Peak || Spacewatch ||  || align=right | 1.0 km || 
|-id=000 bgcolor=#d6d6d6
| 571000 ||  || — || December 23, 2006 || Mauna Kea || Mauna Kea Obs. ||  || align=right | 2.2 km || 
|}

References

External links 
 Discovery Circumstances: Numbered Minor Planets (570001)–(575000) (IAU Minor Planet Center)

0570